= List of tanks of the United Kingdom =

These are lists of UK tanks to enable cross-referencing between the design names and the service names.

== General Staff numbers ==
This is a list of UK tanks up to the end of the Second World War that received designations starting with the letter "A" - these would be designs requested by the General Staff to meet specifications issued, as opposed to private venture designs submitted by manufacturers to the General Staff

General Staff Number	Service name
A1	A1E1 Vickers 'Independent", one built but not taken into service
A2	A2E1 and A2E2: Medium Tank Vickers Mk I and Medium Tank Vickers Mk I (CS version)
A3	3-man tank (Royal Ordnance Factory); Carrier MG Mk I
A4	Vickers Carden-Loyd light tanks. See Light Tank Mk IV, A4E11 and A4E12 referred to the Vickers-Carden-Loyd Light Amphibious Tank
A5	Vickers Carden-Loyd 3-man light tanks. See Mk V light tank and Mk VI light tank
A6	A6 Medium Tank, "16 Tonners"*, led to production of the Medium Tank Mk III
A7	A7 Medium Tank, 3 development tanks built, did not enter service
A8	A8 Experimental Medium Tank, Project cancelled*
A9	Tank, Cruiser, Mk I
A10	Tank, Cruiser, Mk II
A11	Tank, Infantry, Mk I, Matilda I
A12	Tank, Infantry, Mk II, Matilda II
A13; A13 Mk.II; A13 Mk.III	Tank, Cruiser, Mk III; Tank, Cruiser, Mk IV; Tank, Cruiser, Mk V, Covenanter
A14	A14E1 'heavy' Cruiser, prototype built, did not enter service
A15	Tank, Cruiser Mk VI, Crusader
A16	A16E1 'heavy' Cruiser, prototype built, did not enter service
A17	Tank, Light, Mk VII, Tetrarch
A18	(cancelled)*
A19	(cancelled)*
A20	A20 Infantry Tank, prototype built, did not enter service
A21	(cancelled)*
A22; A22D; A22F	Tank, Infantry, Mk IV, Churchill; Gun Carrier, 3in, Mk I, Churchill; Tank, Infantry, Mk IV, Churchill VII
A23	Proposed "Heavy cruiser" based on shortened Churchill tank hull design with reduced armour. Cancelled)*
A24	Tank, Cruiser, Mk VII, Cavalier*
A25	Tank, Light, Mk VIII, Harry Hopkins*
A26	cancelled*
A27L	Tank, Cruiser, Mk VIII, Centaur
A27M	Tank, Cruiser, Mk VIII, Cromwell
A28	cancelled, was to be an Infantry tank variant of Cromwell*
A29	cancelled, was to be a 17-pdr armed assault tank named Clan*
A30	Tank, Cruiser, Mk.VIII, Challenger, 17-pdr armed SP 17pdr, A30 (Avenger)
A31	cancelled, was to be a Cromwell with heavier armour* proposed by Rolls Royce
A32	cancelled, was to be a Cromwell with heavier armour similar to Churchill*
A33	Tank, Heavy Assault, 'Excelsior'*, two built. A27 hull with US M6 heavy tank suspension by English Electric
A34	Tank, Cruiser, Comet I
A35	(cancelled alternative to A34, lengthened hull and enlarged turret ring to accommodate a 17-pdr)*
A36	(cancelled)*
A37	(cancelled)*
A38	Tank, Infantry, Valiant* single example built
A39	Tank, Heavy Assault, Tortoise*, six prototypes built
A40	(cancelled, was to be a heavier A30)*
A41	Tank, Cruiser, Centurion I
A42	Tank, Infantry, Mk IV, Churchill VII (A22F redesignated 1945)
A43	Tank, Infantry, Black Prince*
A44	(cancelled, similar to A35 with thicker armour)*
A45	A45 Infantry Support Tank later becoming the FV201 universal tank*
A46	Light Tank
Project numbering moves to the FV series from A45/A46 onwards. A46 may have been the last of the British tanks to get the A series designation.

*Did not enter service

== Alphabetical lists ==
Includes the C names

- Caernarvon
- Centurion
- Challenger
- Challenger 1
- Challenger 2
- Challenger 3
- Charioteer
- Chieftain
- Churchill
- Comet
- Conqueror
- Contentious
- Conway
- Covenanter
- Cromwell
- Crusader
- Light Tank Mk VI
- Matilda I
- Matilda II
- Medium Tank A/T 1 - an amphibious tank prototype
- TOG 1
- TOG 2
- Valentine

== See also ==
- List of FV series military vehicles - Covers post-1945 UK tanks with other vehicles
- British armoured fighting vehicle production during World War II
- Light tanks of the United Kingdom
