= A7 medium tank =

Interwar British tank prototype

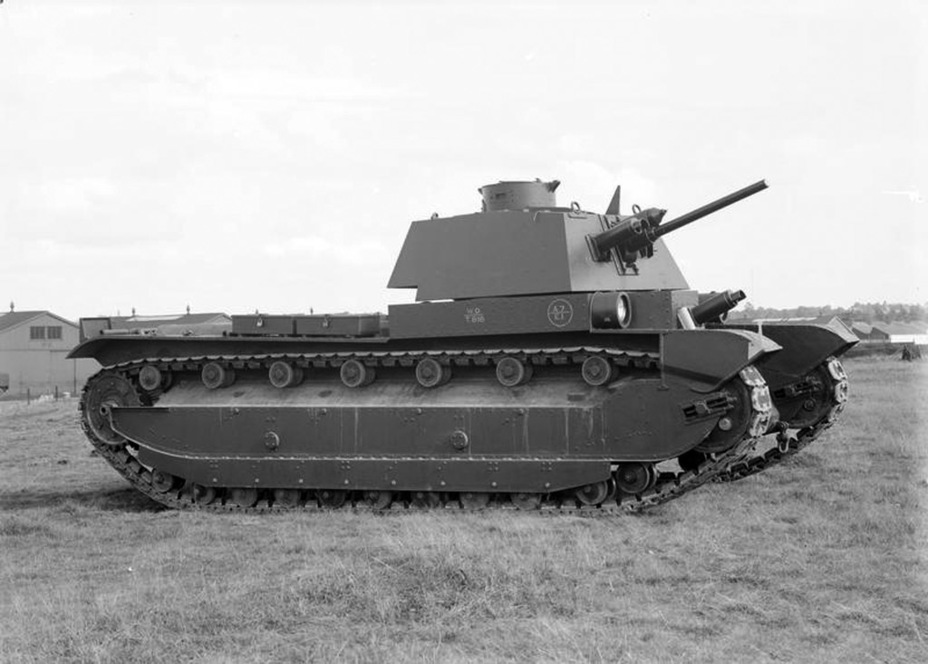
Medium Tank A7E1

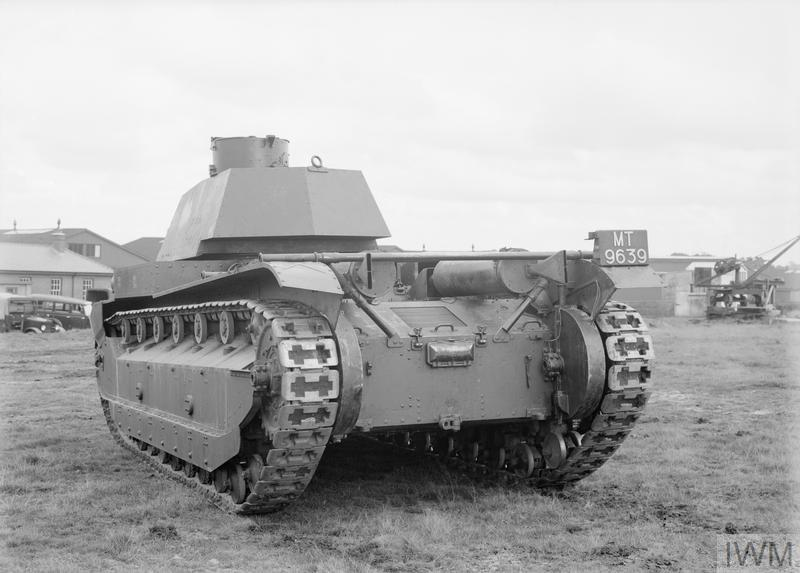
Medium Tank A7E1

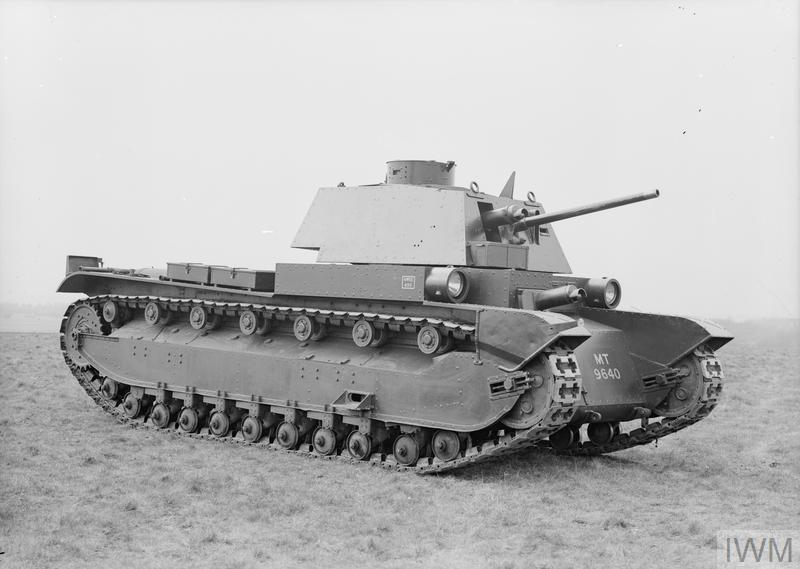
Medium Tank A7E2

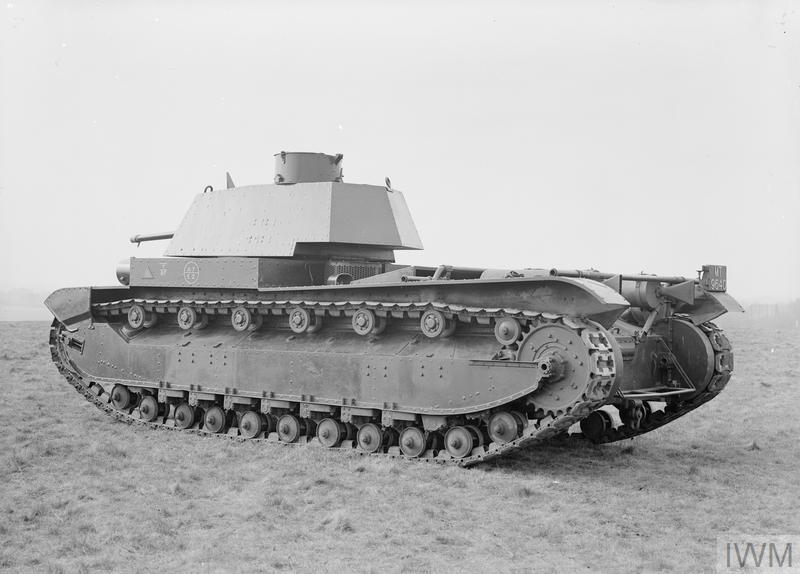
Medium Tank A7E2

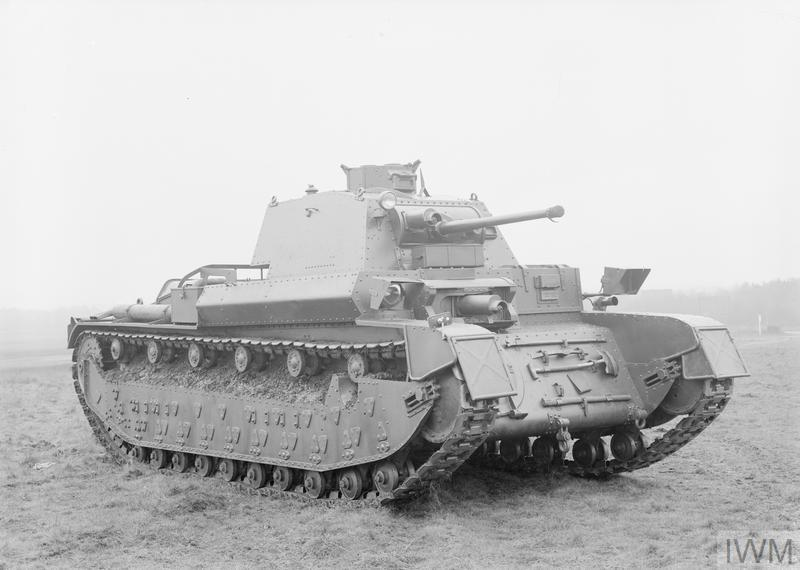
Medium Tank A7E3

The A7 Medium Tank, (Note: the A7 was the British General Staff number identifying the specification) (or Medium Tank A7), was a British experimental medium tank design of the Interwar Period.

== Design and development ==
The A7, known as the "14-tonner" was intended as a cheaper and lighter design to previous tanks, including the A6 Medium Tank, by not using separate machine gun turrets.

They were designed under the Chief Superintendent of Design at the Royal Ordnance Factory, Woolwich, who built three prototypes. A7E1 and A7E2 were completed by end of 1929. They differed in the gearbox used; E1 had a 4-speed gearbox as used on the Medium Mk III, the E2 a Wilson planetary gearbox. They both used the 120 horsepower air-cooled Armstrong Siddeley engine. Both used epicyclic steering. The suspension was based on that of the Birch gun.

Instead of machine gun turrets that the A6 had, a gunner with a Vickers Machine gun was placed next to the driver and behind the front plate. The crew was reduced to 5 people, with a 3-man turret.

During trials, it became obvious that the designers of the tank had been optimistic in their speed estimations. it was supposed to be able to reach a speed of 40 km/h, but could not accelerate past 24 km/h. The suspension on the A7E1 was very poor, and while the spring suspension on the A7E2 was better, it frequently broke. The Vickers-Horstmann suspension was tested on the A6, and proposed for the A7E2, but this were abandoned as it was considered too heavy. The second prototype was abandoned in 1936.

In January 1934 work was started on A7E3 which was required to be a "fast" tank and needed a more powerful powerplant. Instead of the air cooled Armstrong Siddeley engines, an engine of the Associated Equipment Company was chosen. However, one engine was not powerful enough so a second engine was installed to create a twin power plant.

The A7E3 was built in May 1934, but did not begin testing until 1936. The first tests showed that the tank was superior to its predecessors. Its on road speed was increased to 39 km/h and its off-road speed was increased to 26 km/h. However, the brakes were very unreliable and eventually the suspension completely failed.

It was attempted to install a Liberty L-12 engine onto the tank, to massively increase the speed, but this did not work with the suspension. In 1937, work on the A7E3 was ended.

== History ==
The A7 was part of a period of British tank building when three different types of tank were being developed, the light, infantry and cruiser tanks. The A7 led to development of cruiser tanks, designed to take on a traditional cavalry role, exploiting gaps and working independently of the infantry.

Despite never entering production, ideas from the A7 were carried onto later British cruiser tank designs. The turret design, altered to take a 2-pounder (40mm) gun was carried forward onto the A9 (Cruiser Mk I) and A10 (Cruiser Mk II) specification tanks, the E3 engine design with a twin powerplant was used for the A12, more commonly known as the Matilda II infantry tank. Its suspension was carried onto the A22, or the Churchill.

== Variants ==
Type	Engine	Gearbox	Suspension	Speed	Weight (tons)	Armament
A7E1 (1929–1931)	Armstrong Siddeley 120 hp V8 petrol air cooled	4-speed Armstrong Siddeley	Compensated leaf springs	40 kph theoretical (24 kph during trials)	14	One QF 3-pounder gun and two .303in Vickers machine guns
A7E2 (1929–1931)	Armstrong Siddeley 120 hp V8 petrol air cooled	Wilson hydraulic planetary	Single bogies with vertical volute coil springs	40 kph (24 kph during trials)	16.8	One 3pdr gun and two .303in Vickers machine guns
A7E3 (1934–1937)	Associated Equipment Company 280 hp Twin 6-cylinder CI (diesel) 7.74 L actual 252 hp	Wilson hydraulic planetary	Helical coil spring on single wheel trailing bogies	39 kph on roads and 26 kph off-road theoretical	18.2	One 3pdr QF gun and two .303in Vickers machine guns

== See also ==
- Medium Mark III - another British medium tank under development at the same time.
- Cruiser tank - ideas from the A7 were carried on to this tank.
