= Cruiser tank =

Class of tank

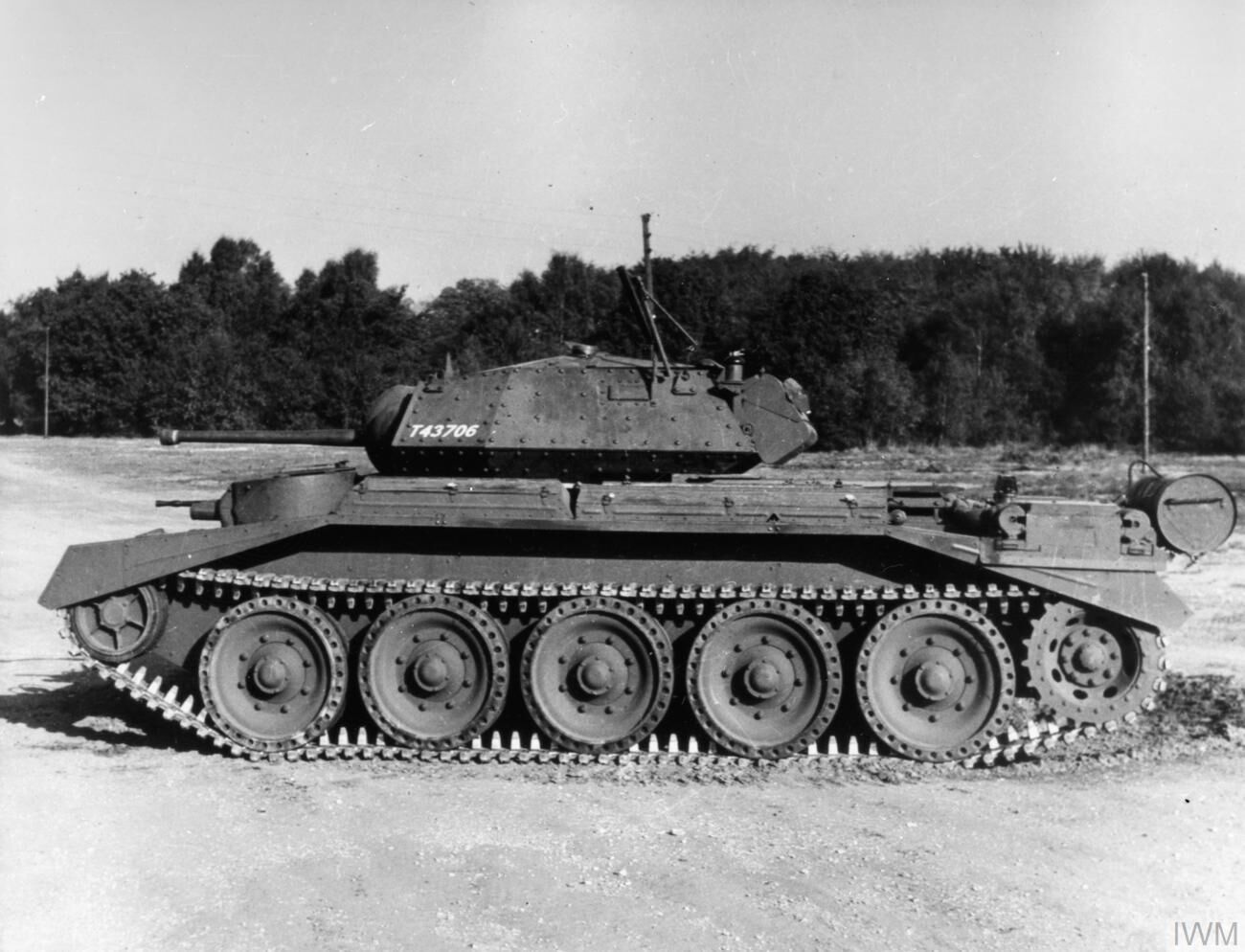
- Crusader Mark I with auxiliary turret
- Type: Tank
- Place of origin: United Kingdom

Service history
- In service: 1937–1945
- Used by: British Army
- Wars: Second World War

The cruiser tank (sometimes called cavalry tank or fast tank) was a British tank concept of the interwar period for tanks designed as modernised armoured and mechanised cavalry, as distinguished from infantry tanks. Cruiser tanks were developed after medium tank designs of the 1930s failed to satisfy the Royal Armoured Corps. The cruiser tank concept was conceived by Giffard Le Quesne Martel, who preferred many small light tanks to swarm an opponent, instead of a few expensive and unsatisfactory medium tanks. "Light" cruiser tanks (for example the Cruiser Mk I) carried less armour and were correspondingly faster, whilst "heavy" cruiser tanks (such as the Cruiser Mk II) had more armour and were slightly slower.

The British cruiser tank series started in 1938 with the A9 and A10 cruiser tanks, followed by the A13, A13 Mark II, the A13 Mark III Covenanter in 1940 and the A15 Crusader which entered service in 1941. The Crusader was superseded by the A27 Cromwell in 1944. The A34 Comet, a better-armed development of Cromwell, began to enter service in late 1944. The Centurion tank of 1946 became the "Universal tank" of the United Kingdom, transcending the cruiser and infantry tank roles and becoming one of the first main battle tanks (MBT).

== Background ==
Dissatisfaction with experimental medium tank designs of the mid-1930s led to the development of specialised fast cruiser tanks, where armour thickness was sacrificed for speed and infantry tanks, in which speed was sacrificed for heavier armour. Financial constraints had made it impossible to produce a vehicle suitable for close support and for exploitation. British armoured operations theory flowed from the decision to build two types of tank and equip two types of armoured formation. Cruisers were operated by armoured regiments of the Royal Armoured Corps, established on 4 April 1939, in armoured divisions, some regiments coming from the Royal Tank Regiment (RTR) and some from cavalry regiments converted during the war. Infantry tanks went to Army Tank Battalions, sometimes grouped administratively into Army Tank Brigades of the RTR. Small, fast, lightly armed tanks like the Light Tank Mk VI operated as reconnaissance vehicles.

Giffard Le Quesne Martel originated the cruiser concept while Assistant Director and then Deputy Director of Mechanisation at the War Office in the 1930s. Martel considered that medium tanks were too complicated and expensive for infantry support where they would be too vulnerable to anti-tank weapons and rejected claims that they could fire accurately when moving, so would gain no benefit from their speed. Martel preferred a large number of smaller and simpler tanks to swamp an opponent, instead of a few comparatively expensive medium tanks. Work should continue on a universal tank in the long term but from 1936 to 1939, Martel gave much thought to the infantry tank; he did not want medium tank development to be split but saw the logic of it, given the constraints on tank development. Tanks were necessary for mobile operations in armoured divisions and for infantry support in attacks on fortified defensive positions; a vehicle satisfactory for both tasks appeared to be impossible to attain. Two types of vehicle led to two theories and procedures, infantry tank thinking coming from the experience of tank operations from 1916 to 1918, when British tanks had been used for infantry support. Armoured division theory emphasised the speed of cruiser tanks and independent action to protect flanks, attack the opponent's flanks and rear, to counter-attack and conduct pursuit operations.

=== Interwar ===
Tank production October 1938 – June 1940
Year	Light	I tank/ Cruiser	Total
1938; 4th Qtr	169	29	198
1939	734	235	969
1940 to June	140	418	558
Total	1,043	682	1,725

In 1936, the War Office decided on a light tank for the cavalry, a cruiser tank, a medium tank and an infantry or assault tank. By 1938, the medium tank had stagnated as a research project, in favour of heavier cruiser and infantry tanks and after the outbreak of war, the move towards heavy infantry tanks capable of breaking through the Siegfried Line (Westwall) on the German border.

In 1934, Sir John Carden of Vickers-Armstrongs had produced a "Woolworth" medium tank to a 1934 specification (General Staff number A.9) for a close support tank, using elements of the Medium Mk III design (which had been abandoned due to financial reasons) but lighter and using a commercial engine to be cheaper. It was accepted as an interim design for limited production as the Cruiser Tank Mark I. It was expected to be replaced by a Christie suspension design. From 1937–1938, 125 A9s were built. The A9 was lightly armoured but capable of 25 mph (40 km/h) and carried a highly-effective 2-pounder anti-tank gun.

The Cruiser Mk II (A10), was designed by Carden as an infantry tank, built to the same design with added armour for 30 mm (1.2 in) of protection. It was insufficiently armoured for the role but as a "heavy cruiser", it was put into production in July 1938 as another interim design. It had the same gun as the A9, was the first to be equipped with the Besa machine gun and 175 Mk IIs were produced by September 1940. Experience with the A9 during the Battle of France in 1940 revealed shortcomings, including inadequate armour and a lack of space for the crew, but it saw useful service in France, the Western desert and Greece in 1941. Orders for the Mk I and Mk II Cruisers were limited, for an advanced and faster cruiser tank which would incorporate Christie suspension designed by J. Walter Christie and have better armour.

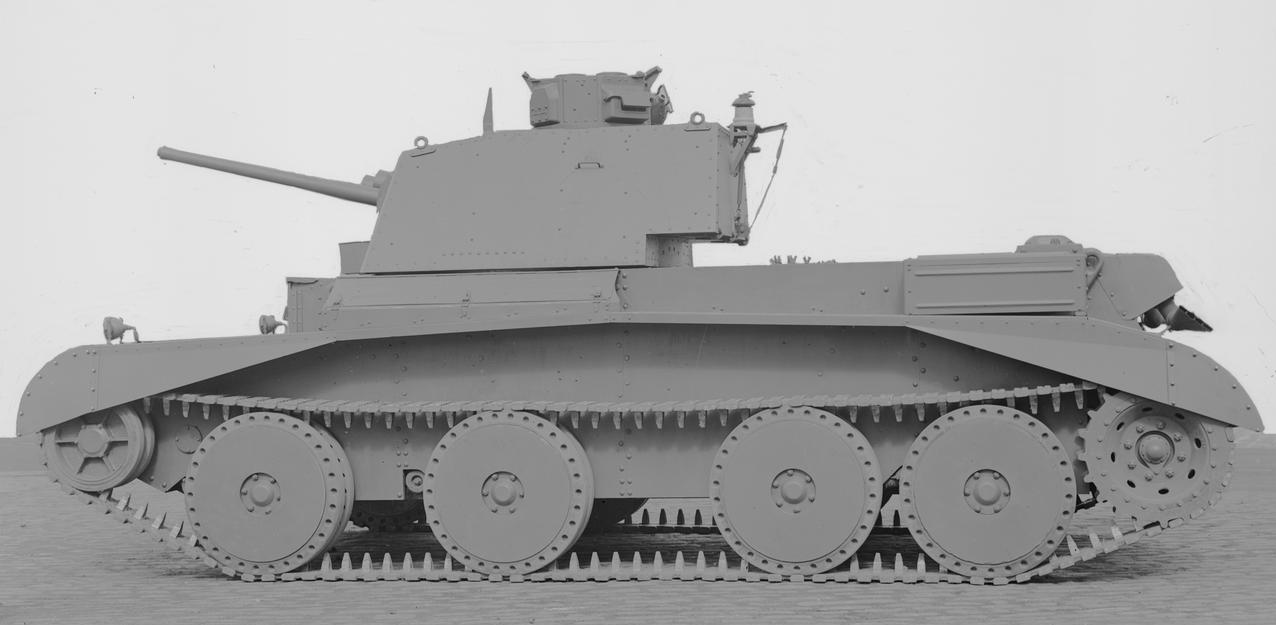
The Cruiser Mark III (A13) with large wheels typical of the Christie suspension

In 1936, General Giffard LeQuesne Martel, a pioneer in tank design who had published works on armoured warfare and pioneered the lightly armoured "tankette" concept to enhance infantry mobility, became Assistant Director of Mechanisation at the War Office. Later that year, Martel had watched Soviet tanks at the Red Army's autumn manoeuvres including the BT tank, which they had developed from Christie's work. He urged the adoption of a tank that would use the suspension system and also follow the Christie practice of using a lightweight aircraft engine such as the Liberty L-12 engine or a Napier Lion. The government authorised purchase and licensing of a Christie design via the Nuffield Organization.

The tank A13 E1 was rudimentary and too small for British use but the Nuffield suspension was most effective and this became the basis of the Cruiser Mk III (A13). Following testing of two Nuffield-built prototypes (A13E2 and A13E3), the A13 was ordered into production and 65 were manufactured by mid-1939. The Mk III weighed 31,400 pounds (14.2 t), had a crew of 4, a 340 hp engine which gave a top speed of 30 mph (48 km/h) and was armed with a 2-pounder (40 mm) gun and a machine gun. When it was introduced in 1937, the army still lacked a formal tank division. The trackless element of the Christie suspension was discarded as adding little value for the extra complexity. The Cruiser Mk IV (A13 Mk II) had heavier armour than the Mk III and production started in 1938.

== Development ==
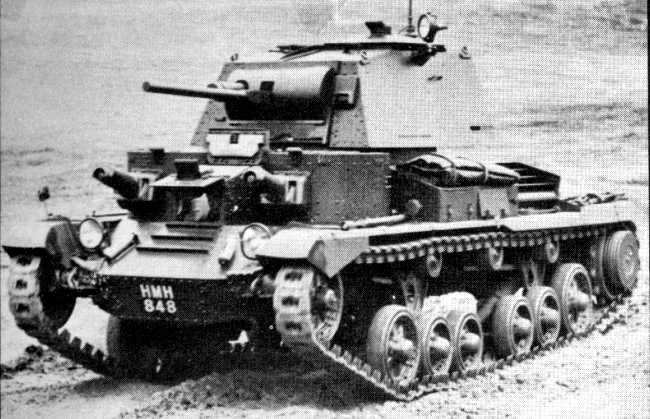
Cruiser Tank Mark I (A9)

The first cruisers were armed with the 2-pounder (40 mm) gun. This gun had adequate armour penetration against early war tanks but was never issued high explosive ammunition. This made the cruisers less able to deal with towed anti-tank guns, which was a serious deficiency at the long ranges of engagements during the Desert Campaign. The additional machine gun turret (as mounted on the Crusader) was no substitute for HE rounds. As the armour of German tanks increased British cruisers were up-gunned with the more powerful 57 mm Ordnance QF 6 pounder, starting with the Crusader Mk. III (an interim move pending the introduction of the next cruiser tank). Early marques of what would become the Cromwell were also fitted with the 6-pounder but the gun still did not have a satisfactory HE round.

The Cromwell as planned was to have a High Velocity 75 mm gun but it was too large for the turret ring and the Cromwell tanks was fitted with the QF 75 mm (a bored-out 6-pounder that could take US 75 mm ammunition). The new 75 mm gun provided greater HE capability at the expense of some armour penetration and it was still adequate to deal with the majority of German armoured vehicles. Part of the Cromwell's success was its high-power to weight ratio, provided by the adoption of the Rolls-Royce Merlin engine minus the supercharger as the Meteor, which delivered sufficient power for the Cromwell to have a maximum speed around 40 mph (64 km/h) on roads. The M4 Sherman had a top speed on roads of about 30 mph (48 km/h). The Cromwell also had slightly superior cross-country speed and mobility. The new engine enabled the tank to be far more heavily armoured and armed than previous cruiser designs.

As the Cromwell could not be fitted with the HV 75 mm, work was undertaken to produce a tank for the powerful 17-pounder anti-tank gun, able to take on the most powerfully-armed German vehicles. The Cruiser Mk VIII Challenger was developed, mounting a 17-pounder gun on a lengthened Cromwell hull in a new turret. The Challenger was an unhappy compromise, though it was popular with its crews. The cut in armour protection to allow the mounting of the larger and heavier gun meant it was not well suited to closer range engagements and it threw its tracks more often than the Cromwell. As Britain had large numbers of US M4 Sherman tanks, an extemporaneous conversion of the Sherman to take a 17-pounder (as the Sherman Firefly) proved effective in providing more 17-pounder-gun tanks. The Firefly accompanied Churchills, Shermans and Cromwells generally at a ratio of 1:4. The production of Fireflies greatly outpaced that of the Challenger but in Cromwell-equipped units, the Challenger was generally preferred as the Sherman had a slower road speed and inferior cross-country mobility.

The culmination of British efforts was the Comet tank with the 77 mm HV, a more compact gun than the 17-pounder firing the same projectiles from the cartridge of the QF 3-inch 20 cwt anti-aircraft gun. The Comet was a further development of the Cromwell, a "heavy" cruiser tank, which sought to remove the need for 17-pounder armoured vehicles, such as the Challenger or Firefly. The Comet reduced its road speed in comparison to the Cromwell to 32 mph (51 km/h), in favour of better armour protection and a weapon able to penetrate the armour of the heavier German tanks whilst not sacrificing HE capability. The tank had a short service life as design for the Centurion was already well underway, with the first prototype arriving in 1945. Despite the emphasis on mobility, most early cruiser designs were plagued by mechanical unreliability, notably in the hot and gritty desert of the North Africa Campaign. This problem was usually caused by rushed development and introduction into service. After the debacle in France of 1940, cruiser tank designs were ordered "off the drawing board", particularly given the urgent need for tanks. The Liberty engine which also powered early Cruiser tanks was beginning to show its age and was being pushed to its limit in tanks such as the Crusader. This problem was not fully solved until the débût of the Cromwell in 1944, with its powerful and reliable Rolls-Royce Meteor engine.

== History ==
=== Second World War ===
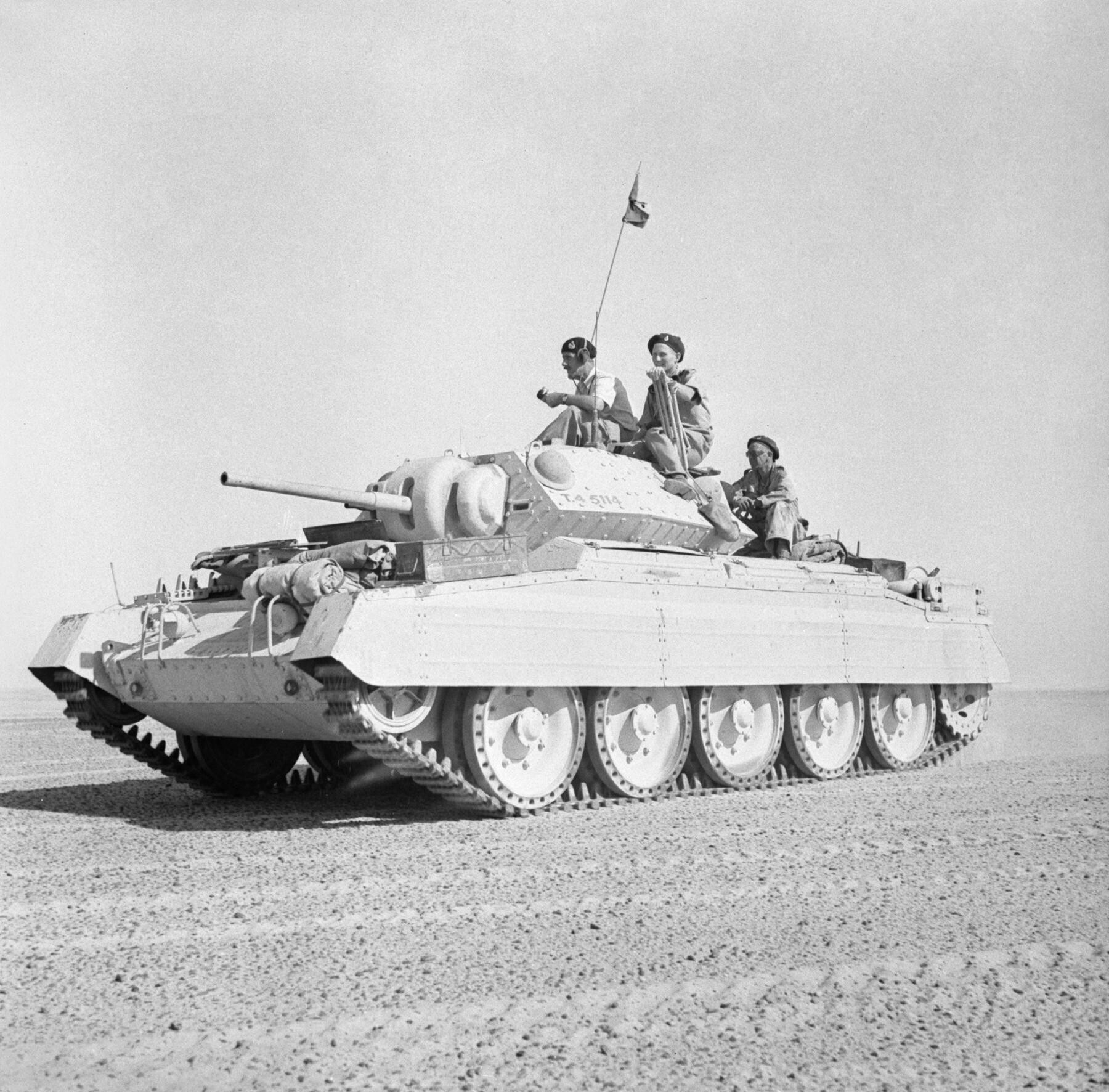
2-pounder armed Crusader in the desert.

The Tank, Cruiser, Mk VI, (Crusader), was used in large numbers in the Western Desert Campaign. The contemporary Covenanter was unreliable until its chronic overheating problems were resolved and was retained in Britain for training. The Cavalier, Centaur and Cromwell tanks were the planned successors to the Covenanter and Crusader. Intended to be in production by 1942, development was delayed and the Crusader was up-gunned to the Mk.III with a 6-pounder gun; the Cavalier was a development of the Crusader. Centaur and Cromwell tanks were an alternative design using the Cavalier engine and the new Rolls-Royce Meteor respectively, the three vehicles were similar in appearance. Orders for the Cavalier were cut back while the similarity between Centaur and Cromwell meant some Centaurs were finished as Cromwells. The Cavalier was used for training while Centaur and Cromwell tanks went into action in the Invasion of Normandy. The Comet tank entered service in north-west Europe in 1945 but neither the Cromwell or Comet tanks were in sufficient numbers to replace American tanks in the British Army.

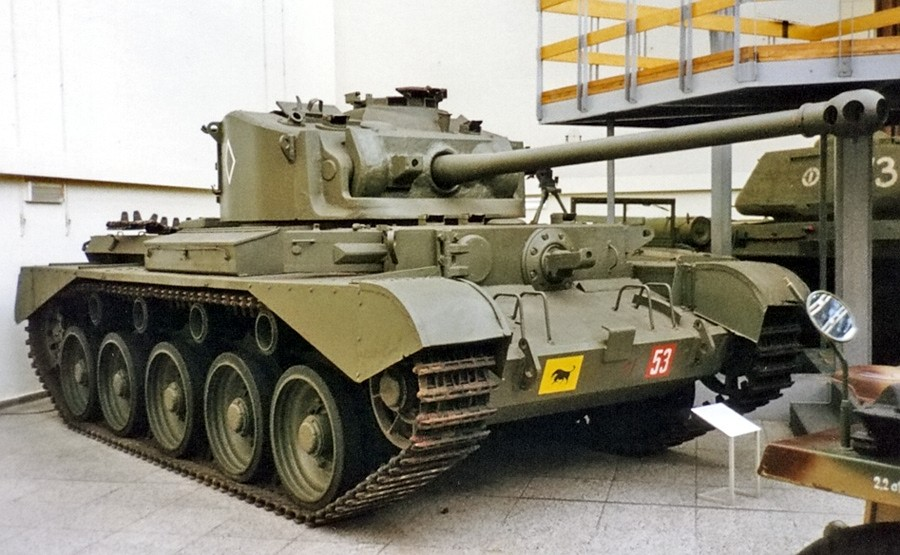
Comet tank

During the war, the development of much more powerful engines and better suspension enabled cruiser tanks to increase in size, armour and firepower while retaining their speed and mobility. With "cruiser" tanks similarly armoured to heavier, slower, infantry tanks, the convergence of cruisers and infantry tank designs made the distinction obsolete. The Centurion tank was designed as a heavy cruiser, by combining the mobility of a cruiser tank and armour of an Infantry tank. The Centurion transcended its cruiser tank origins and became the first modern British main battle tank.

== Cruiser tanks in other armies ==
In the 1930s, the Czechoslovak Army divided its tank into three categories, light tanks, infantry tanks and medium tanks. The cavalry category was analogical to cruiser tank concept. The cruiser-tank concept was also employed by Canada, and Soviet Union in the 1930s, as exemplified by the BT tank series (bystrokhodniy tank, [fast tank]).

== See also ==
- History of the tank
- Tanks of the interwar period
- Tanks in World War II
- Tanks in the Cold War
- Post-Cold War Tanks
- Armoured fighting vehicle
- Tank classification

== Sources ==
- Chamberlain, Peter; Ellis, Chris (1969). British and American Tanks of World War II: The Complete Illustrated History of British, American and Commonwealth Tanks, Gun Motor Carriages and Special Purpose Vehicles, 1939–1945. New York, NY: Arco. ISBN 978-0-668-01867-8.
- Harris, J. P. (1995). Men, Ideas and Tanks: British Military Thought and Armoured Forces, 1903–1939. Manchester: Manchester University Press. ISBN 978-0-7190-4814-2.
- Postan, M. M. (1952). British War Production. History of the Second World War: United Kingdom Civil Series. London: HMSO. OCLC 459583161.
- Postan, M. M.; et al. (1964). Hancock, K. (ed.). Design and Development of Weapons: Studies in Government and Industrial Organisation. History of the Second World War, United Kingdom Civil Series. London: HMSO & Longmans, Green & Co. OCLC 681432.
- Steele, Brett D. (2005). Military Re-engineering Between the World Wars. RAND. ISBN 978-0-8330-3721-3.
