= Matilda I =

Matilda I may refer to:

- Matilda I of Boulogne
- Matilda I (tank) - A British tank of the early part of World War II
- Empress Matilda - Queen Matilda I of England
