= Matilda tank =

"Matilda tank" may refer to:

- Matilda I (tank), also known by its specification number A11, a British infantry tank in service 1938–1940
- Matilda II, A12, a British infantry tank in service 1939–1945
