= Mk VI light tank =

British light tank during the Second World War

Tank, Light, Mk VI
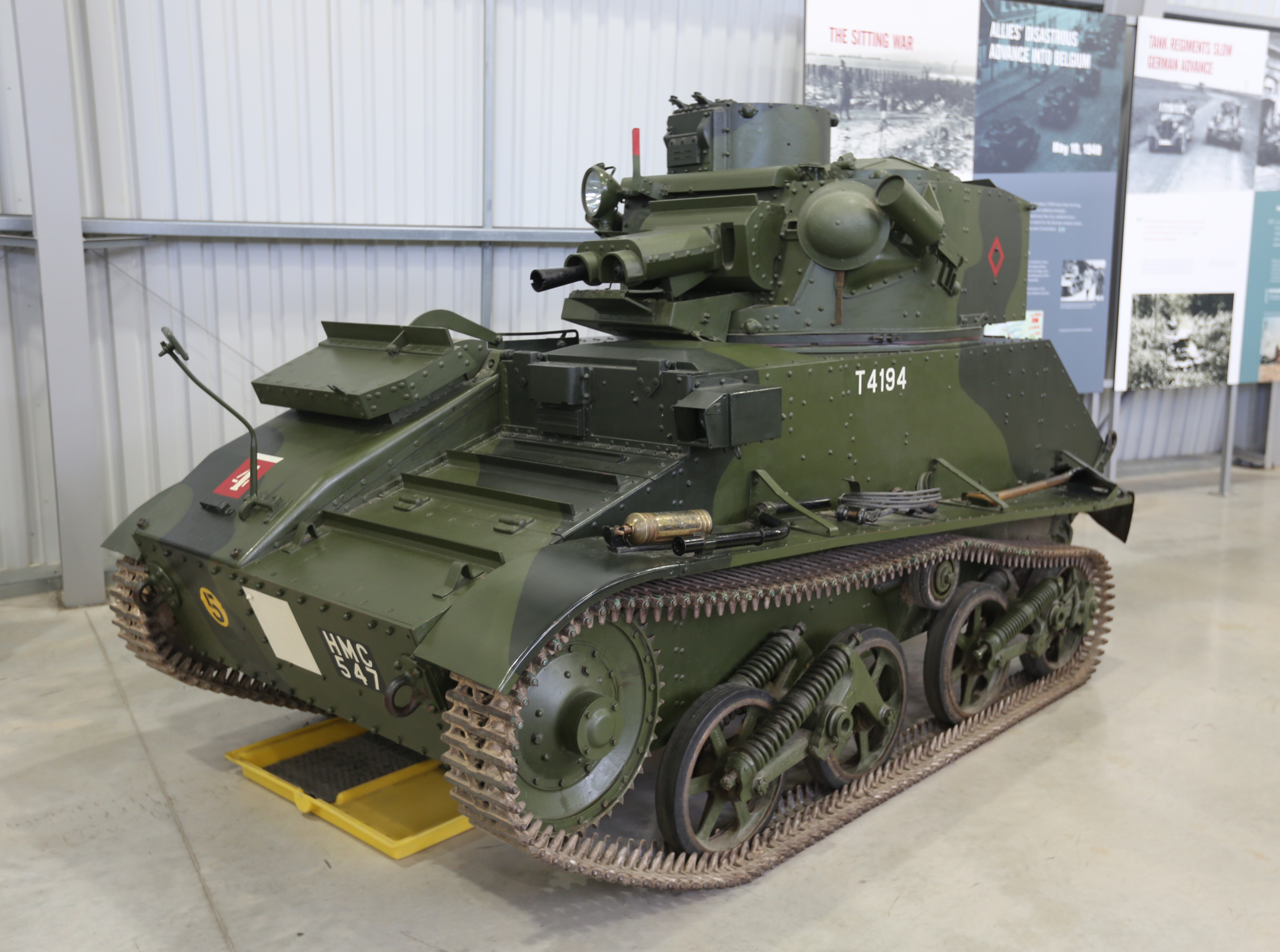
- Light tank Mk VI preserved at Bovington Tank Museum
- Type: Light tank
- Place of origin: United Kingdom

Service history
- In service: 1936–1942 (frontline); 1948 Arab–Israeli War
- Used by: United Kingdom; Australia; New Zealand; Canada; Egypt
- Wars: Second World War; 1948 Arab–Israeli War

Production history
- Designer: Vickers-Armstrongs
- Manufacturer: Vickers-Armstrongs
- Produced: 1936–1940
- No. built: 1,682
- Variants: Mk VIA, Mk VIB, Mk VIC

Specifications
- Mass: 4.85 long tons (4.93 t) later 5.2 long tons (5.3 t)
- Length: 13 feet (4.0 m)
- Width: 6 ft 10 in (2.08 m)
- Height: 7 ft 3 in (2.26 m)
- Crew: 3 (commander, gunner, driver)
- Armour: 4 – 14 mm
- Main armament: .50 in Vickers machine gun (Mk VIC – 15 mm Besa machine gun)
- Secondary armament: .303 in Vickers machine gun (Mk VIC – 7.92 mm Besa machine gun)
- Engine: Meadows 6-cylinder petrol 88 hp (66 kW)
- Power/weight: 16.9 hp/ton (Mark VIB and VIC)
- Transmission: Wilson pre-selector gearbox
- Suspension: Horstmann inclined springs
- Ground clearance: 10 inches (250 mm)
- Fuel capacity: 30 imperial gallons (140 L; 36 US gal)
- Operational range: 130 miles (210 km)
- Maximum speed: 35 miles per hour (56 km/h) (25 miles per hour (40 km/h) off-road)

The Tank, Light, Mk VI was a British light tank, produced by Vickers-Armstrongs in the late 1930s, which saw service during the Second World War.

== Development history ==
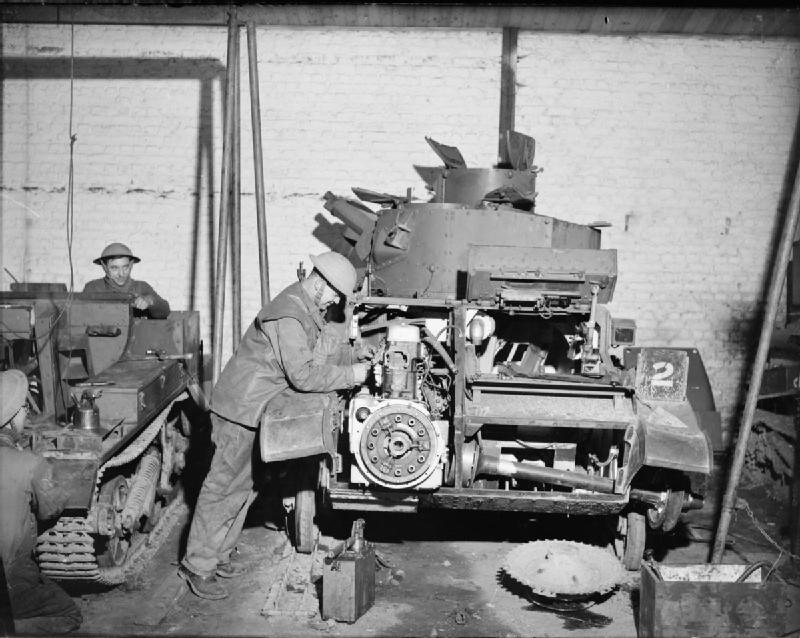
A Mk VI undergoing maintenance, France 1940. The location of the engine, beside the driver, can be seen

The Tank, Light, Mk VI was the sixth in the line of light tanks built by Vickers-Armstrongs for the British Army during the interwar period. The company had achieved a degree of standardization with their previous five models, and the Mark VI was identical in all but a few respects. The turret, which had been expanded in the Mk V to allow a three-man crew to operate the tank, was further expanded to give room in its rear for a wireless set. The weight of the tank was increased to 10,800 pounds (4,900 kg), which although heavier than previous models actually improved its handling characteristics, and an 88 horsepower (66 kW) engine was added to the model to increase its maximum speed to 35 miles per hour (56 km/h). It had the Horstmann coil-spring suspension system, which was found to be durable and reliable, although the fact that the tank was short in relation to its width and that it pitched violently on rough ground made accurate gunnery whilst moving exceptionally difficult. The Mk VI possessed a crew of three consisting of a driver, gunner and commander, who also doubled as the radio operator, between 4 mm (0.16 in) and 14 mm (0.55 in) of armour, which could resist rifle and machine gun bullets, and its armament consisted of one water-cooled .303 inch (7.7 mm) Vickers machine gun and one .50 inch (12.7 mm) Vickers machine gun.

Production of the Mk VI began in 1936 and ended in 1940 with 1,682 Mark VI tanks having been built. Many of those produced were actually variants designed to solve problems found with the original design. The Mk VIA had a return roller removed from the top of the leading bogey and attached to the hull sides instead, and also possessed a faceted cupola. The Mk VIB was mechanically identical to the Mk VIA but with a few minor differences to make production simpler, including a one-piece armoured louvre over the radiator instead of a two-piece louvre, and a plain circular cupola instead of the faceted type. The Mk VIC, which was the last in the MK VI series, had the commander's cupola removed and had wider bogies and three carburettors to improve engine performance; it was also more powerfully armed than the other models, replacing the .303 and .50 Vickers machine guns with co-axial 15 mm (0.59 in) and 7.92 mm (0.312 in) Besa machine guns. A small number of specialized variations were also built based on the Mk VI chassis. The Tank, Light, AA Mk I was built in the aftermath of the Battle of France and was intended to act as a counter-measure against attacks by German aircraft. It featured a power-operated turret fitted with four 7.92 mm Besa machine guns; a Mk II was produced which was mechanically similar but had improvements, such as better quality sights for the machine guns and a larger turret for easier access. A variant on the Mk VIB was produced for service with the British Indian Army, in which the commander's cupola was removed and replaced with a hatch in the turret roof.

== Operational history ==
When the Mk VI was first produced in 1936, the Imperial General Staff considered the tank to be superior to any light tank produced by other nations, and well suited to the dual roles of reconnaissance and colonial warfare. Like many of its predecessors, the Mark VI was used by the British Army to perform imperial policing duties in British India and other colonies in the British Empire, a role for which it and the other Vickers-Armstrongs light tanks were found to be well suited. When the British government began its rearmament process in 1937, the Mk VI was the only tank with which the War Office was ready to proceed with manufacturing; the development of a medium tank for the Army had hit severe problems after the cancellation of the proposed "Sixteen Tonner" medium tank in 1932 due to the costs involved, and cheaper models only existed as prototypes with a number of mechanical problems. As a result of this, when the Second World War began in September 1939, the vast majority of the tanks available to the British Army were Mk VIs; there were 1,002 Mk VI light tanks, 79 Mk I (A9) and Mk II (A10) cruiser tanks and 67 Matilda Mk I infantry tanks. Of these tanks, only 196 light tanks and 50 infantry tanks were in use by operational units of the army.

The majority of the tanks in the British Expeditionary Force when the Battle of France began in May 1940, were Mark VI variants. The seven Royal Armoured Corps divisional cavalry regiments, the principal armoured formations of the BEF, were each equipped with 28 Mk VIs. The 1st Armoured Division, elements of which landed in France in April, was equipped with 257 tanks, of which a large number were Mk VIB and Mk VICs. The 3rd Royal Tank Regiment, which formed part of the division's 3rd Armoured Brigade, had 21 Mark VI light tanks at this time.

The British Army lost 331 Mark VI light tanks in the Battle of France of 1940. Several of these vehicles were captured by the Wehrmacht and redesignated as Leichter Panzerkampfwagen Mk.VI B 735(e) (for Mk VIBs) and Leichter Panzerkampfwagen Mk.VI C 736(e) (for Mk VICs). They were used for training purposes until the autumn of 1942. During 1941 several of these captured vehicles were converted to create self-propelled artillery and supporting vehicles for the 227th infantry division, the first self-propelled artillery in the Wehrmacht. They carried a 10.5 cm or 15.0 cm field howitzer and were designated G.Pz. Mk. VI (e). In September 1941 the division deployed to Army Group North in Russia and were used during the winter 1941–42 battles.

The Mk VIB was also by the 7th Armoured Division against the Italians in the North African campaign late in 1940. At this time, the British had 200 light tanks (presumably Mk VIBs) along with 75 cruiser tanks (A9, A10, A13) and 45 Matilda IIs. An attack by the 3rd Hussars at Buq Buq on 12 December 1940 resulted in its tanks getting bogged down in salt pans and severely mauled. In ten minutes, 13 tanks were destroyed, ten officers and men killed – including the CO – and 13 wounded. The 7th Armoured Division had 100 tanks left on 3 January 1941. This increased to 120 tanks by 21 January, when they were used in flanking far into the rear and gathering up scattered Italian troops, sometimes joining or leaving the main attacks to the cruiser and Matilda II tanks. During an engagement at Mechili on 24 January, six Mk VIs were destroyed by newly arrived superior Italian Fiat M13/40s for no loss, forcing a retreat until cruiser tanks arrived. The 2nd RTR continued to battle the Italians with light tanks as late as 6 February 1941.

The Mk VIB made up a significant amount of the tanks sent to the Battle of Greece in 1941, mostly with the 4th Hussars. Ten Mk VIB tanks fought with the 3rd The King's Own Hussars during the Battle of Crete. The same armoured unit had previously embarked three MK VIB tanks for the Norwegian Campaign, but they were lost in transit to a German aircraft attack. The tanks also saw limited service against the Japanese in the Dutch East Indies.

== Gallery ==
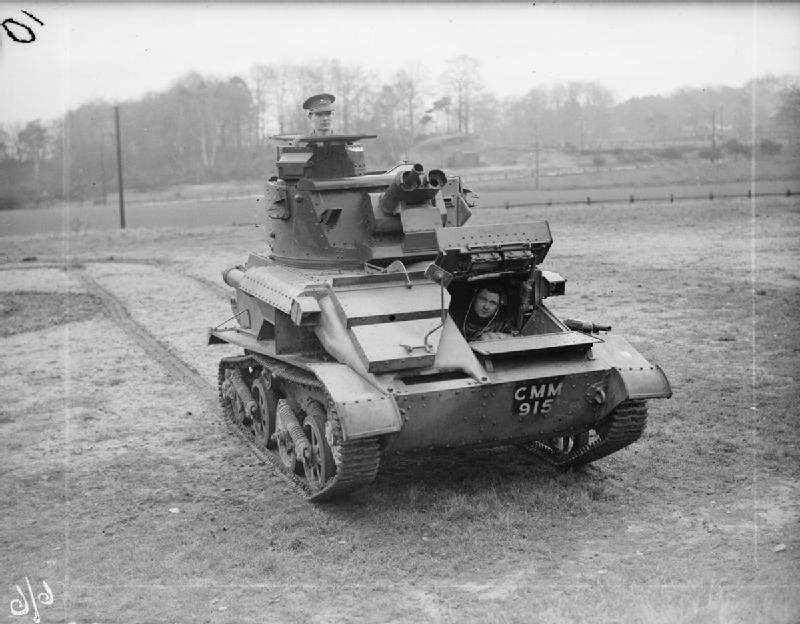
Light Tank Mk.VIA of the 3rd King's Own Hussars

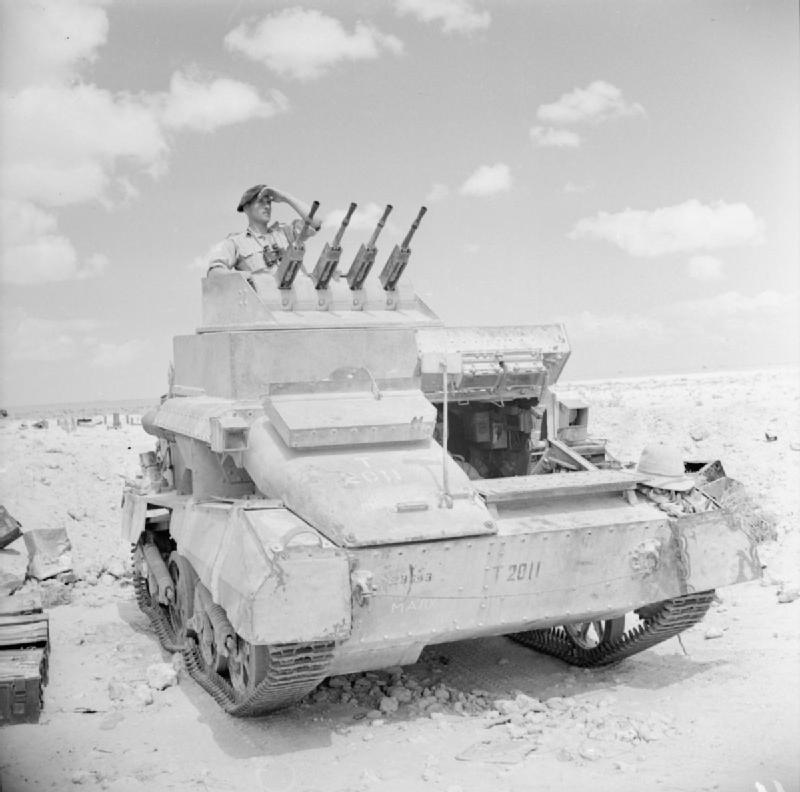
Light Tank AA Mk I

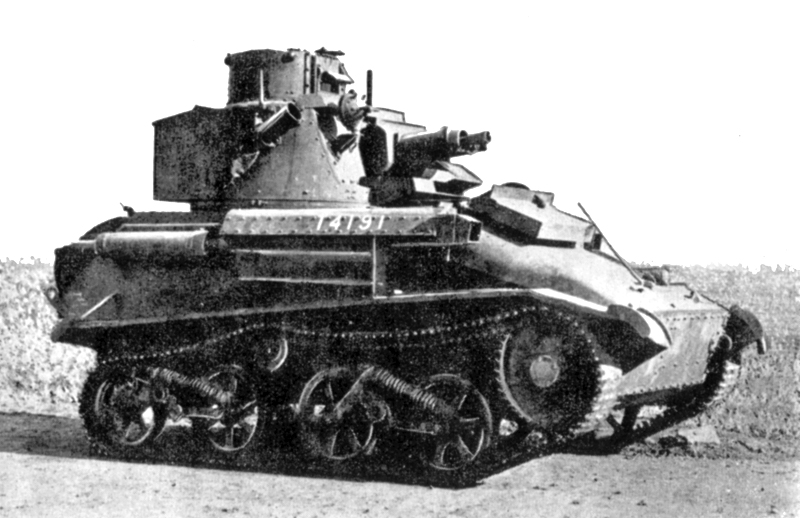
Light Tank Mk VIB

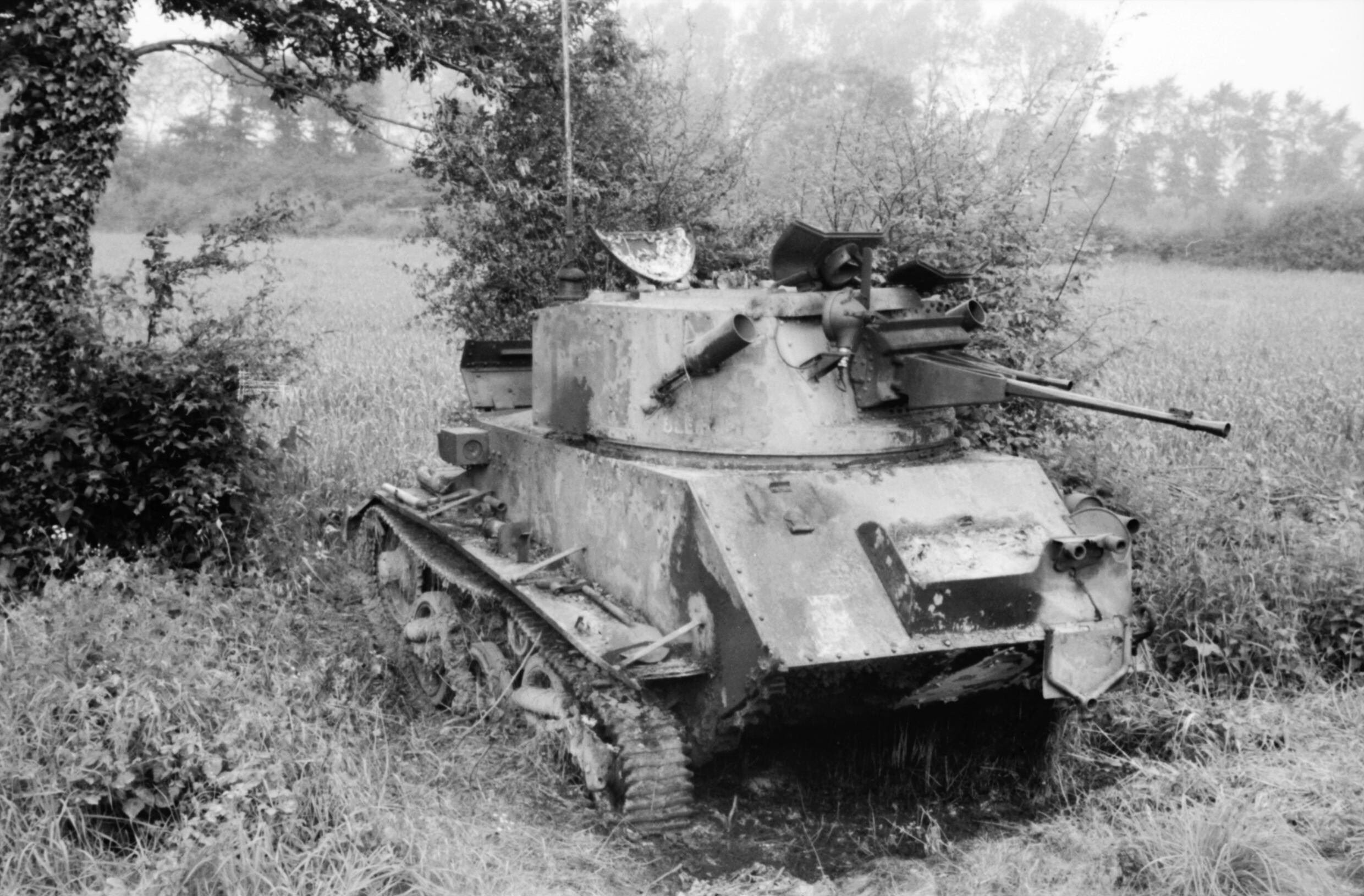
Vickers Light Tank Mk VIC knocked out during an engagement on 27 May 1940 in the Somme sector

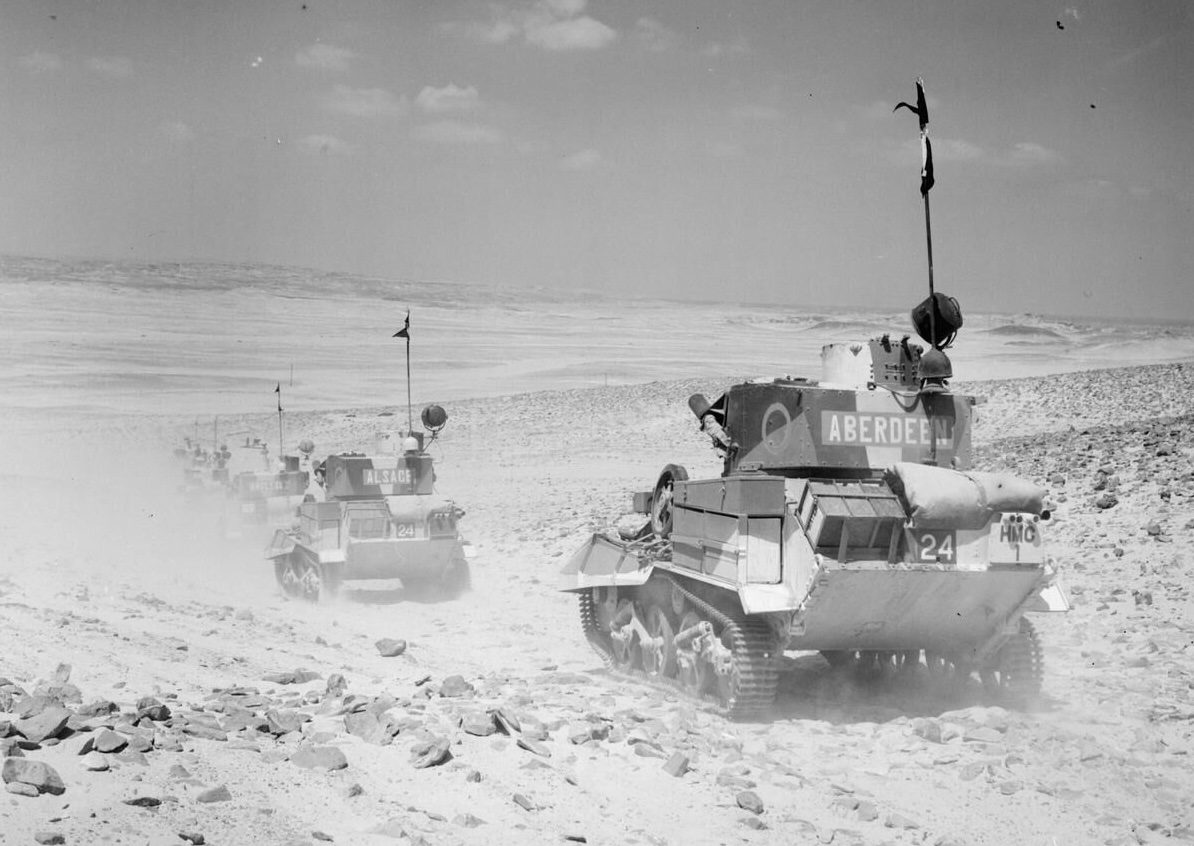
Vickers light tanks cross the desert, 1940.

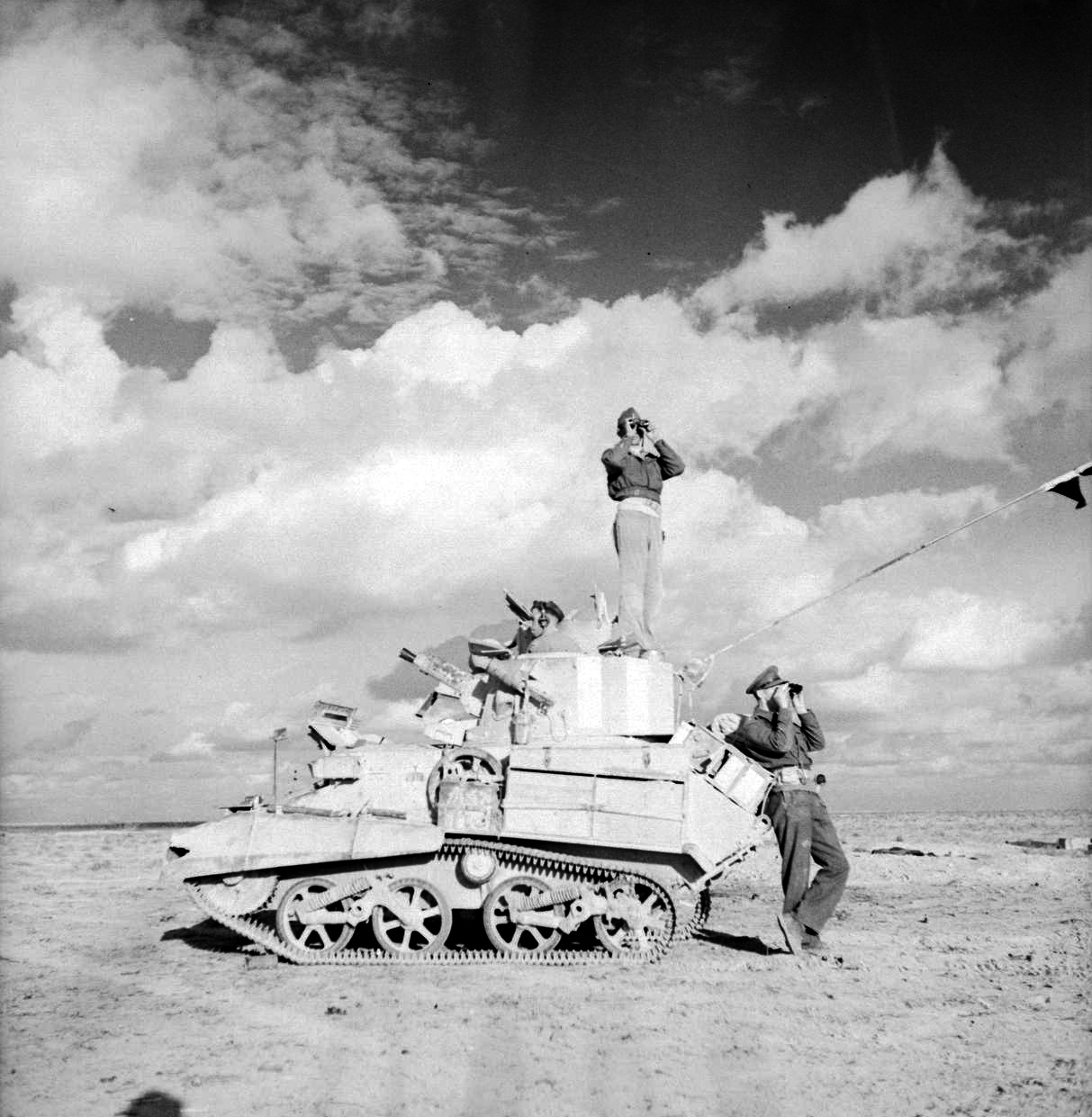
The crew of a Light Tank Mk VIB reconnoitring near Tobruk, 28 November 1941

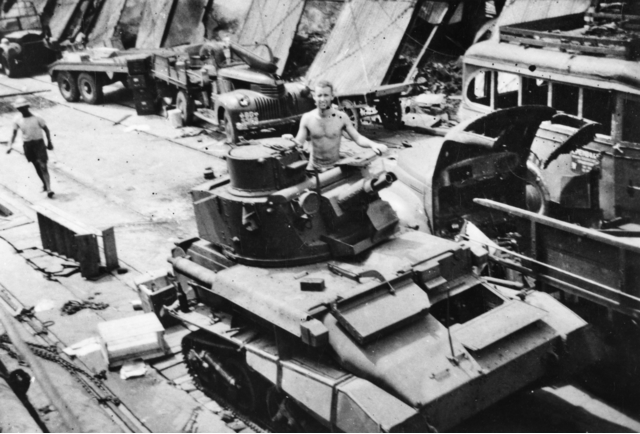
A Light Tank Mk.VIB from a light tank squadron of the 3rd King's Own Hussars, Oosthaven, Sumatra, Netherlands East Indies, circa. 1942

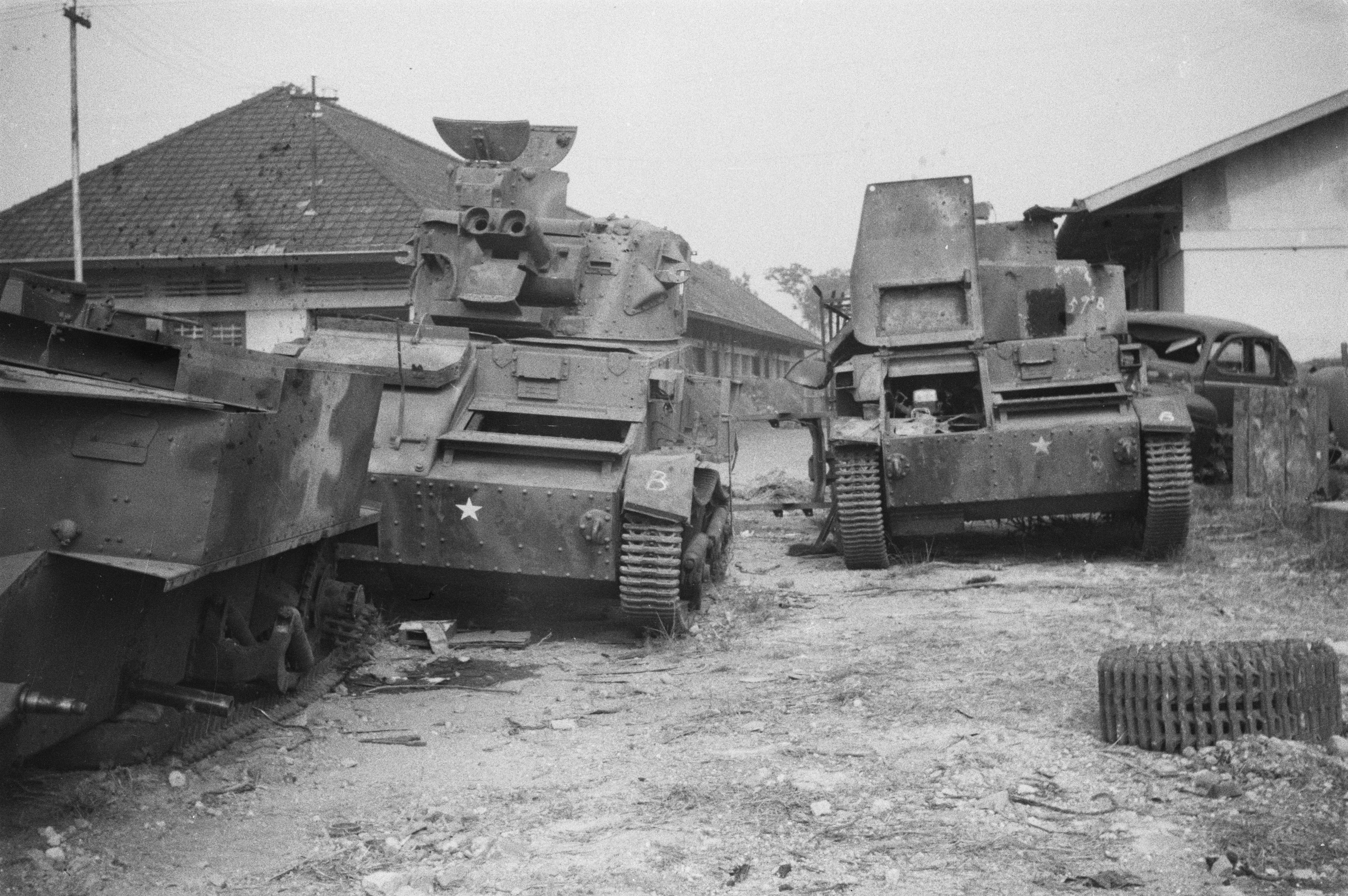
Two Light Tank Mk.VIs recaptured from the Imperial Japanese Army at a workshop in Bandung, 1946

== See also ==
Comparable vehicles

- Germany Panzer I
- Italy L3/33, L3/35
- Japan: Type 94
- Poland: TK-3 and TKS
- Romania: R-1
- Soviet Union: T-27, T-37A, T-38
- Sweden: Stridsvagn m/37
