= A20 heavy tank =

British infantry tank prototype

A20
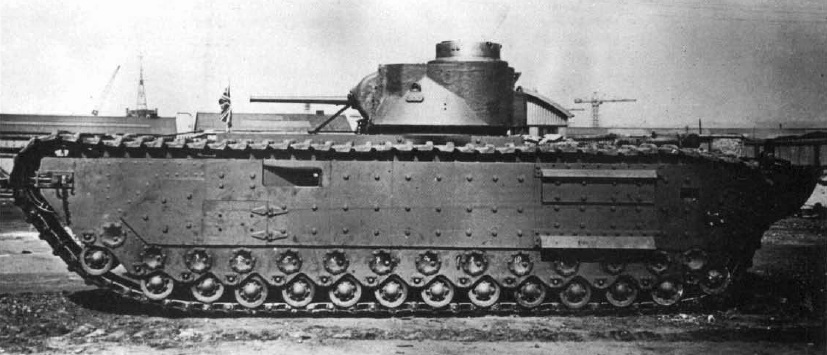
- Type: Infantry tank

Production history
- Designer: Mechanisation Board
- Designed: 1939
- Manufacturer: Harland and Wolff
- No. built: 2

Specifications
- Mass: approx 40 tons
- Crew: 7
- Armour: maximum of 80 mm
- Main armament: QF 2-pounder (40 mm) in turret QF 2-pounder (40 mm) in hull
- Secondary armament: machine guns
- Engine: Flat-12 Meadows DAV; 300 hp
- Maximum speed: 15 mph (24 km/h)

A20 was a British tank design by Harland & Wolff to meet an Army requirement for an infantry tank that could replace the Matilda II and Valentine tank. It was designed in the expectation that conditions would be similar to those of the First World War.

The specification was produced by Superintendent of Tank Design at Woolwich with design by the Mechanization Board and passed to Harland & Wolff for detail work and to build a pilot. Four pilots were ordered in February 1940. Two – A20E1 and A20E2 – were built. The first pilot took part in trials in June 1940. It was shipped from Northern Ireland to Vauxhall Motors (without a turret) in August; thereafter to Mechanical Warfare Experimental Establishment at Farnborough.

The Battle of France indicated that trench warfare was not going to be the case in the Second World War. A new specification, A22, was drawn up and Vauxhall who had been engaged to find a suitable power plant – their Bedford "twin six" engine – for the A20 were instructed to bring a tank based on the A20 into production as soon as possible. This would enter service as "Tank, Infantry, Mark IV" later named Churchill. The first pilot Churchill was finished by November 1940.

The decision to cancel the order for 100 A20 was made in June 1940 and that the four pilot models – constructed of mild steel – would be used for component testing.

After the trials with the MWEE (Mechanical Warfare Experimental Establishment), the A20E1 moved to the Experimental Bridging Establishment, Christchurch then back to Farnborough, this time to the Wheeled Vehicle Experimental Establishment. There it was used as trial load to test a twenty-wheel 70-ton capacity tank transporter trailer built by Cranes of Dereham.

== Sources ==
- Shillito, Chris, A20, archived from the original on 16 March 2013
- Chamberlain, Peter; Ellis, Chris (1969). British and American Tanks of World War II. Arco Publishing.
- Fletcher, David (2019). Churchill Infantry Tank. New Vanguard 272. illustrated by Henry Morshead. Osprey. ISBN 9781472837349.
