= Cruiser Mk I =

British cruiser tank

Tank, Cruiser, Mk I (A9)
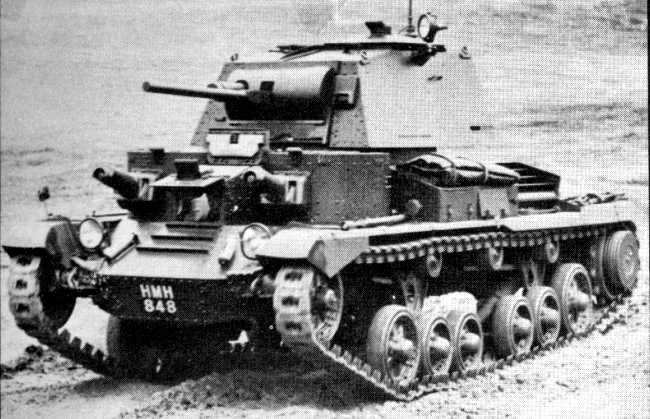
- Tank, Cruiser, Mk I (A9)
- Type: Cruiser tank
- Place of origin: United Kingdom

Service history
- In service: 1938–1941
- Used by: British Army
- Wars: Second World War

Production history
- Designer: Sir John Carden
- Designed: 1934–1936
- Manufacturer: Vickers
- Produced: 1936–1941
- No. built: 125

Specifications
- Mass: 12.8 long tons (13.0 t) battle weight
- Length: 19 ft (5.8 m)
- Width: 8 ft 4 in (2.5 m)
- Height: 8 ft 8 in (2.65 m)
- Crew: 6 (Commander, gunner, loader, driver, 2x MG gunners)
- Armour: 6–14 mm
- Main armament: QF 2-pdr (40mm); 100 rounds
- Secondary armament: 3 x 0.303 Vickers machine gun 3,000 rounds
- Engine: AEC 179 6-cylinder petrol 150 hp (110 kW)
- Suspension: sprung triple wheel bogie
- Operational range: 150 miles (240 km)
- Maximum speed: 25 mph (40 km/h)

The Tank, Cruiser, Mk I (A9) was a British cruiser tank of the interwar period. It was the first cruiser tank: a fast tank designed to bypass the main enemy lines and engage the enemy's lines of communication, as well as enemy tanks. The Cruiser Mk II was a more heavily armoured adaptation of the Mark I, developed at much the same time.

== Design and development ==
In 1936, the British War Office designated two different kinds of tanks for future development: heavily armoured infantry tanks to be used in close co-operation with infantry during attacks, and fast mobile cruiser tanks designed to make forays deep into enemy territory.

Due to the cost, British replacement designs for Medium Mark II tanks then in service had been cancelled with only three Medium Mark III built. In 1934, Sir John Carden of Vickers-Armstrong was asked to provide a "reasonably cheap tank" as a replacement for some of the medium models then in use. This design was known by General Staff specification A9.

The pilot model of his medium tank design was finished in 1936 and given the designation A9E1. It incorporated the best features of the cancelled Medium Mk III design, but lighter so that it could be powered by a commercial petrol engine. However, this was still in the time of the Great Depression and the tank had a number of cost-cutting measures applied. It was the first British tank to have a centrally located turret and to have powered traverse. The system was by Nash & Thompson and similar to that being introduced on the Vickers Wellington medium bomber aircraft. The armour was light, with a maximum thickness of 14 mm (0.55 in). Many armour faces were vertical, and there were numerous shot traps, but it could achieve 25 mph (40 km/h) and carried the new high velocity QF 2-pounder (40 mm) gun, which had replaced the QF 3-pounder by the time manufacture started in 1937.

The driver's compartment and the fighting compartments were not separated. As well as the turret armament, which consisted of an Ordnance QF 2 pounder gun and a coaxial Vickers machine gun, there were two small turrets either side of the driver's compartment, each with a Vickers machine-gun. Both of these smaller turrets were permanently manned, which gave the tank a total crew of six (commander, gunner, loader, driver and two machine-gunners).

The A9E1 was tested against other designs and, although lacking in some areas, it was accepted in 1937 as an interim design until a Christie suspension cruiser tank could be delivered. An order was placed for 125. Seventy-five were built by Harland & Wolff, and the other 50 were built by Vickers. Initially, a Rolls-Royce car engine (the 7.67 litre of the Phantom II) was used for the pilot model, but this proved to be underpowered and was replaced by a 9.64 litre AEC bus engine.

The later Valentine infantry tank essentially used the same lower hull and suspension, though with considerably more armour.

The A9 weighed 12 long tons (12 t), was 19 feet (5.8 m) long, 8.7 feet (2.65 m) high, 8.2 feet (2.5 m) wide and had a top speed of 25 miles per hour (40 km/h) on road and 15 miles per hour (24 km/h) off. Its maximum road range was 150 miles (240 km). The ammunition load was 100 rounds for the main gun and 3,000 rounds for the three machine guns.

== Service ==
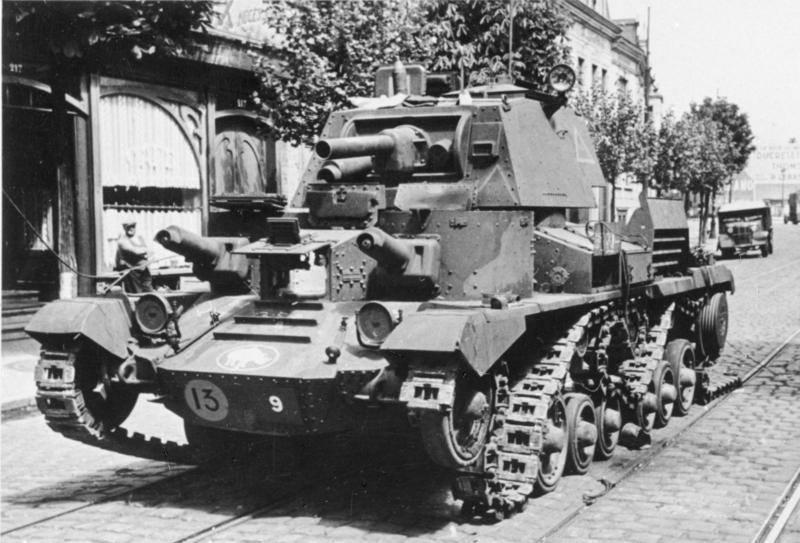
A damaged Cruiser Mk I CS abandoned in Calais, 1940.

The Mark I cruiser began to be delivered in January 1939. 36 tanks were delivered before the start of the war, 40 in September–December 1939 and 49 in 1940.

The Cruiser was an effective tank in the French, Greek and early North African campaigns. The 2-pounder gun was lethal against the early Italian tanks encountered during the North African campaign and could hold its own against Rommel's early Panzer IIs and IIIs. It could also breach the 20–30 mm (0.79–1.18 in) of protective steel on later opponents, such as the Panzer III Ausf D and the Panzer IV Ausf D. It was effective until the Germans introduced the more thickly armoured Panzer IV Ausf E to the desert in the spring of 1941. However, its minimal armour made the A9 very vulnerable to most Axis anti-tank weapons. Also problematic was the lack of high explosive shells for the 2-pounder gun, and even worse the lack of armour-piercing shells for the 94 mm gun on the close support version. Another issue was that the areas around the front machine gun turrets created a frontal surface that was more vulnerable to enemy fire than it would have been had it been a simple flat plate.

The mechanical unreliability of the Cruiser was also a disadvantage. In particular, tracks were easily slewed, causing difficulties.

== Variants ==
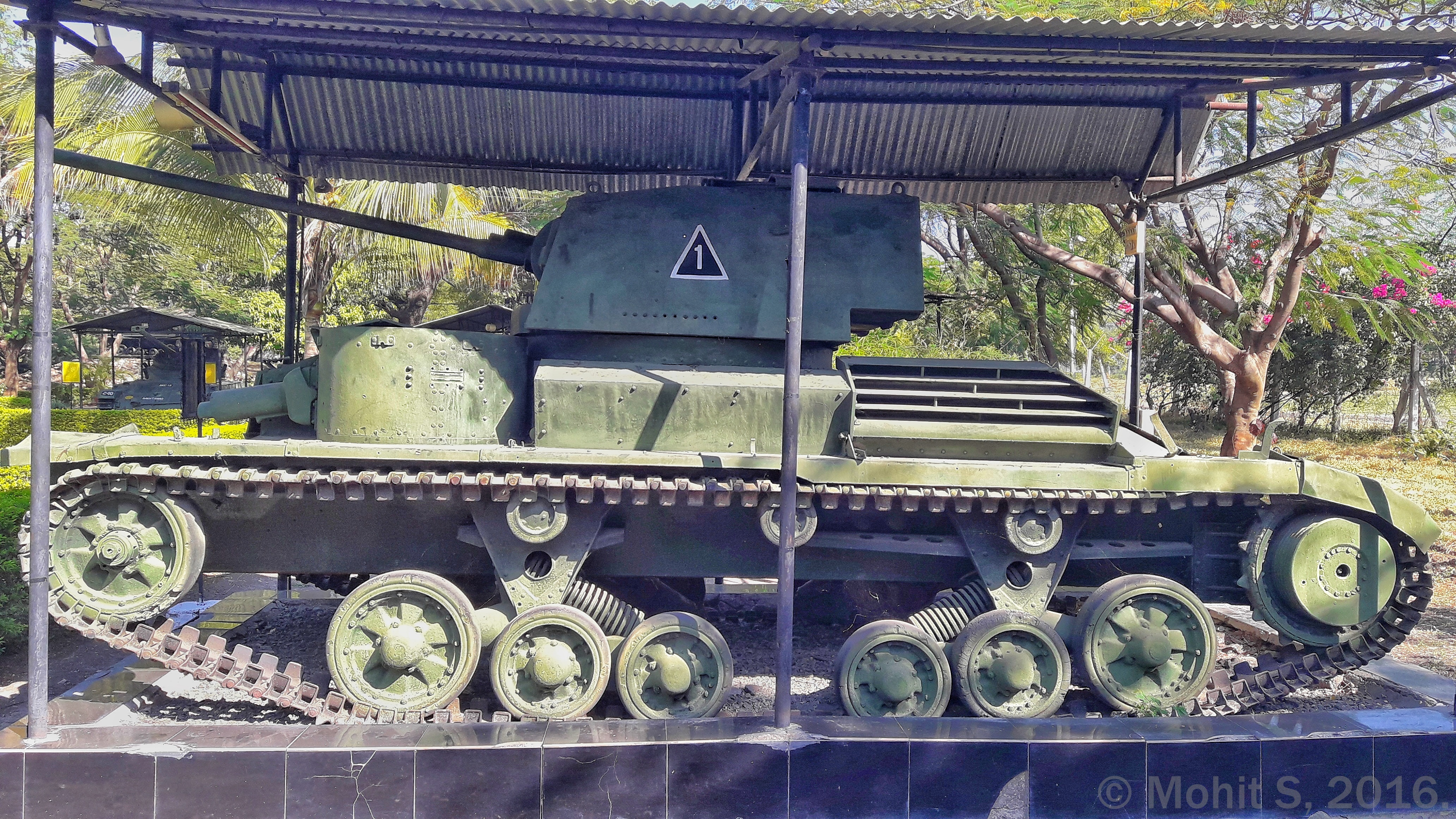
Surviving A9 in an Indian museum

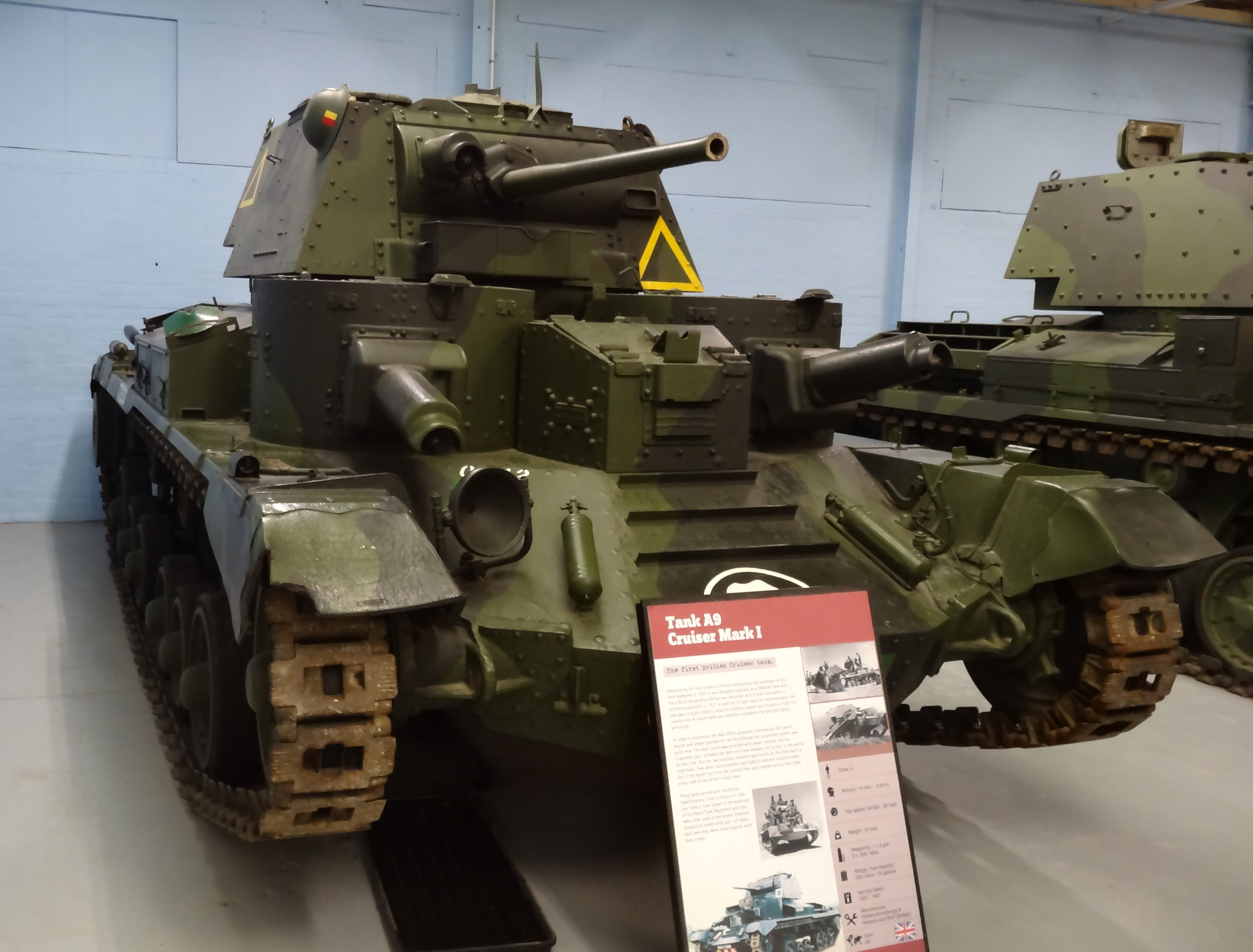
Front view of a surviving A9 in Bovington

Mark I (A9)
Used by the 1st Armoured Division in the Battle of France (1940). Used by the 2nd and 7th Armoured Divisions in North Africa until 1941.

Mark I CS
Had a 3.7 inch (94 mm) /L15 breech-loaded howitzer, derived from the World War I QF 3.7-inch mountain howitzer, instead of the 2-pounder gun. 40 rounds, mostly smoke, were carried.

== Surviving vehicles ==
- On display at The Tank Museum at Bovington, England.
- On display at Cavalry Tank Museum at Ahmednagar, India

== See also ==
- Cruiser tank
- List of tanks of the United Kingdom
