= Infantry tank =

Class of tank

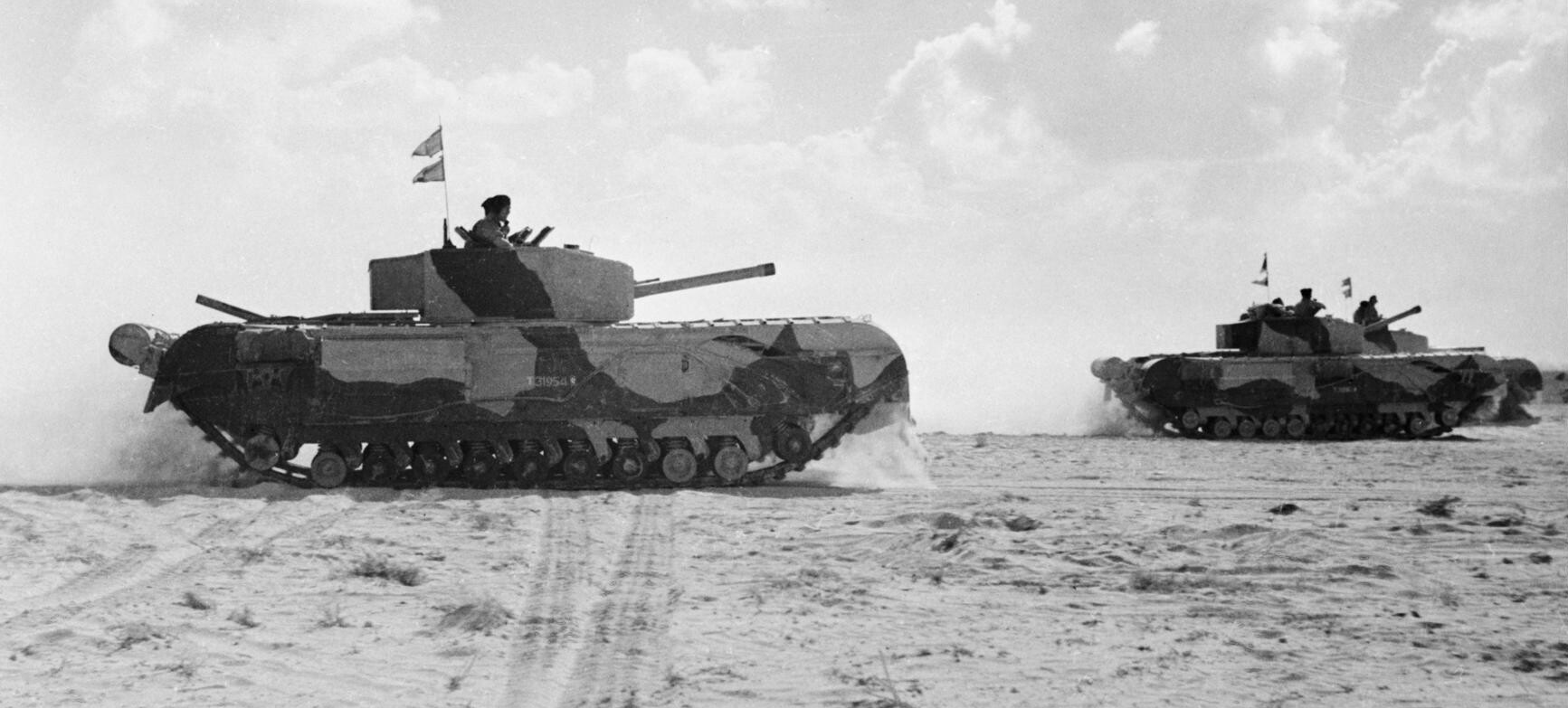
- Churchill tanks during the 2nd Battle of El Alamein
- Type: Tank
- Place of origin: France and the United Kingdom

Service history
- In service: 1938–1945
- Used by: French and British armies
- Wars: Second World War

The infantry tank was a tank concept developed by the United Kingdom and France in the years leading up to World War II. Infantry tanks were designed to support infantrymen in an attack. To achieve this, the vehicles were generally heavily armoured to allow them to operate in close concert with infantry even under heavy fire. The extra armour came at the expense of speed, which was not an issue when supporting relatively slow-moving foot soldiers.

Once an attack supported by infantry tanks had broken through heavily defended areas in the enemy lines, faster tanks such as cruiser or light tanks were expected to use their higher speed and longer range to operate far behind the front and cut lines of supply and communications.

The infantry tank was superseded by the "Universal Tank" concept which could adequately perform the roles of both infantry and cruiser tank, as represented by the Centurion which replaced both the Churchill and any medium or cruiser tanks then in service. This led to the main battle tank.

== Background ==
The experimental armoured formations of the British army were mostly equipped with the Vickers Medium Tank Mk I and Medium Mk II, which were judged obsolete by the 1930s; most of the vehicles were at the end of their mechanical life. It was impractical to build more because their road speed of only 18 mph (29 km/h) was too slow for manoeuvre warfare and their armament of a 3-pounder gun lacked the power to penetrate newer foreign tanks. By 1931, experience with the Experimental Mechanized Force led to the report of the Kirke Committee and specifications for three types of tank, a medium tank with a small-calibre anti-tank gun and a machine-gun, a light tank armed with machine-guns for reconnaissance and to co-operate with medium tanks by engaging anti-tank guns. A close support tank armed with a gun firing high explosive and smoke shells to give covering fire for tank attacks was also specified. The Wall Street crash of 1929 and the Great Depression led to big reductions in the funds made available for the army. Money spent on tracked vehicles fell from £357,000 in 1931–32 to £301,000 in the year 1932–33 and exceeded the 1931 figure only in 1934–35.

In May 1934, Lieutenant-General Hugh Elles was appointed Master-General of the Ordnance and Brigadier Percy Hobart, the Inspector, Royal Tank Corps, asked Vickers to design a tank for infantry co-operation, that could survive all existing anti-tank weapons and be cheap enough for mass production in peacetime. The next year, Vickers had a two-man tank design, with a machine-gun and powered by a civilian Ford V8 engine of 70 hp (52 kW). The prototype of October 1936 weighted 10 long tons (10 t) had a maximum speed of only 8 mph (13 km/h) but carried 60–65 mm (2.4–2.6 in) of armour and was mechanically reliable. The A11, Infantry Tank Mk I, was the first Infantry tank (I tank) and the first practical expression of the decision to split design into I tanks and cruiser tanks, with different functions and tactics, supplied to separate units and formations.

The 1935 edition of the War Office publication, Field Service Regulations (FSR), containing the principles by which the army was to act to achieve objectives, was written by Major-General Archibald Wavell, made breakthrough the responsibility of infantry divisions with the support of Army Tank Battalions, equipped with specialised vehicles for infantry-artillery co-operation, the slow and heavy Infantry tanks. Once a breakthrough had been created, a Mobile Division containing a tank brigade with light and cruiser tanks, would advance through the gap and use the speed and range of its tanks to surprise the defender and attack flanks, headquarters and non-combatant units. By 1939, further amendments to FSR added counter-attacks on an enemy armoured breakthrough. (The codification of the difference between Infantry and cruiser tanks and their functions in FSR 1935, accidentally created an obstacle to all-arms co-operation that lasted long into the Second World War.) Defence against tanks could be achieved by troops finding physical obstacles and by controlling their own anti-tank guns. The obstacles could be woods and rivers or minefields as long as they were covered by fire from other weapons. In places lacking convenient terrain features, lines-of-communication troops would also need anti-tank guns and be trained to set up localities suitable for all-round defence

The need for economy in the design and production of the A11, which was too small for a radio, led to work on a successor, the A12, Infantry Tank Mk II in 1936. Capable of 15 mph (24 km/h), the A12 was still slow but had 60–70 mm (2.4–2.8 in) of armour, making it almost invulnerable to tank guns and standard foreign guns like the German 37 mm Pak 36 anti-tank gun. The tank had a four-man crew and a turret big enough for a radio and an Ordnance QF 2-pounder high-velocity gun, firing solid projectiles capable of penetrating all 1939–1940 German tanks. Vickers and government factories could not take on the work and it was farmed out to a civilian firm, which lacked experience, designers and draftsmen. It took until 1939 to bring the A12 into production as the "Matilda II" and it had not gone into service when the war began, only 67 A11s having been delivered. When the Matilda was supplied to Army Tank Battalions it was an effective tank in the Battle of France and in the Western Desert Campaign, where it outclassed Italian tanks and was effective against standard Italian and German anti-tank guns from 1940 to 1941 but was later found to be too slow for the fast tempo that German panzer units could achieve and unable to engage the more powerful German anti-tank guns from long range with high explosive shells.

== Other tank types ==
Using later terminology, the infantry tank has been compared to a heavy tank, while the cruisers were compared to mediums, lights, or even armoured cars. This comparison can be misleading; late Second World War heavy tanks were intended to have superior anti-tank capabilities, which wasn't a focus of the traditional infantry tank.

The infantry tank was different from either the "heavy tank" or "breakthrough tank" concepts, although some pre-war multi-turreted heavy machines such as the Soviet T-35 and the German Neubaufahrzeug (both taking some of their inspiration from the 1926 Vickers A1E1 Independent – an idea which was abandoned by the War Office in the late 1920s for lack of funding), which were similar, and with similar doctrines for their use. The Neubaufahrzeug was considered too slow for Blitzkrieg tactics and fell from favour. German, and to some extent Soviet, wartime doctrine shifted towards faster medium and heavy tanks fighting large multi-tank battles, with the role of the infantry tank in the assault taken by simpler Sturmgeschütz assault guns.

An important difference, however, was that heavy tanks were generally very well armed, while infantry tanks were not necessarily better armed than other types. For example, the Soviet 45-ton KV-1 heavy tank and 25-ton British Matilda II infantry tank were deployed at about the same time in 1940. These two models had similar levels of armour protection and mobility, but the KV's 76.2 mm main gun was much larger than the Matilda's 2-pounder (40 mm).

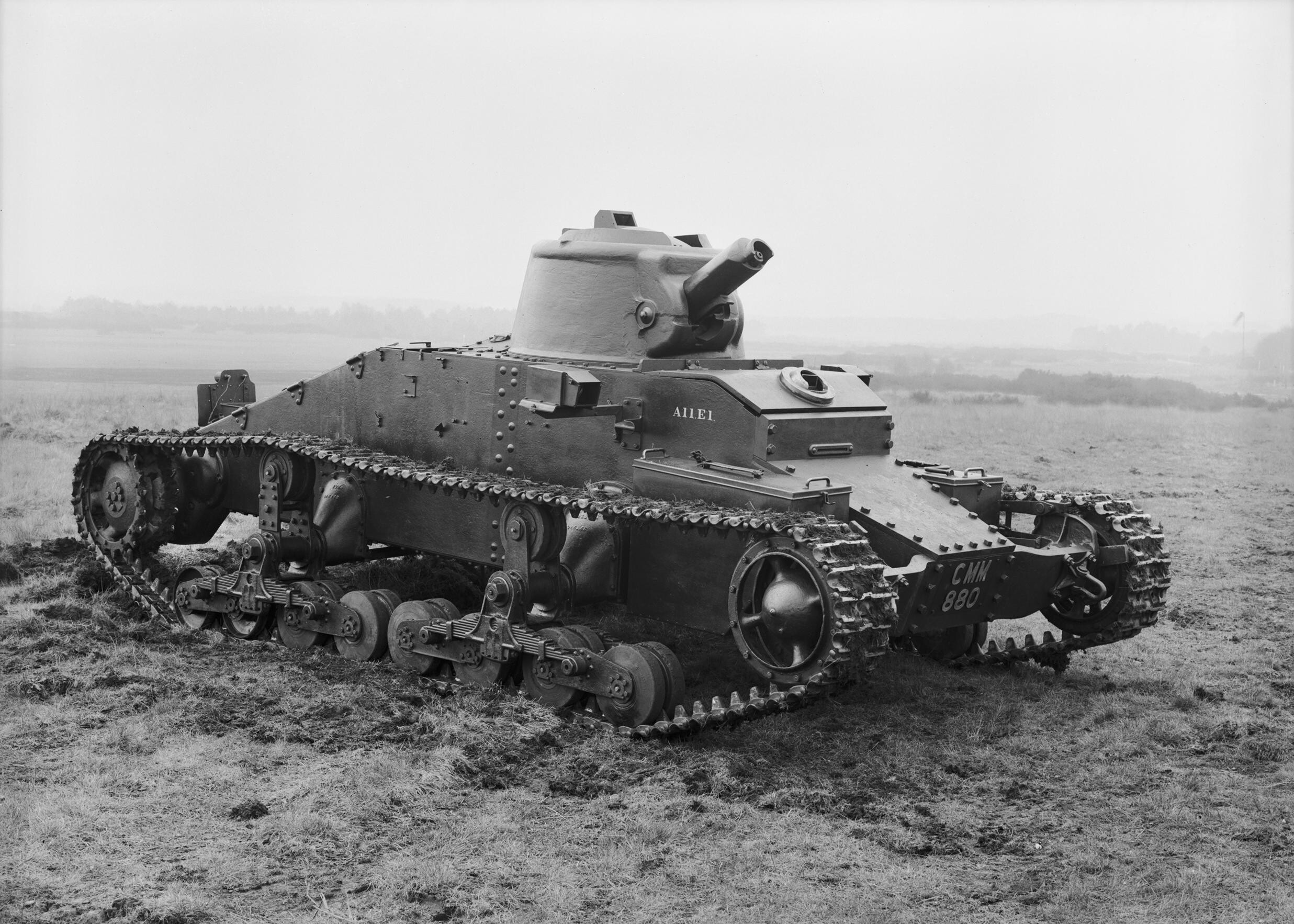
British Matilda I tank

In British practice, the main armament of the infantry tank went in three phases. The pre-Dunkirk British Army Matilda I had only a single heavy Vickers machine gun, a compromise forced by the lightness of its chassis and its target cost. The Matilda II gained a capable anti-tank capacity for its time, with the 2-pounder, but these were only issued with solid-shot (i.e. non-explosive) for anti-tank use and had little effect as artillery when providing close support for the infantry. A separate variant of the Matilda was fitted with a 3-inch howitzer. The ultimate evolution of the British infantry tank concept began with the Churchill Mk I, where a hull-mounted 3-inch howitzer could support infantry assaults with high explosive shells while the turret had a 2-pounder for use against other tanks. (Note: a few Churchills were fitted with the guns in reverse positions – 3 inch howitzer in turret and 2 pdr in hull) As the increasing size of tanks, and their turret ring diameters, allowed such a howitzer to be turret-mounted in vehicles such as the Crusader Close Support (CS) and Centaur CS cruiser tanks. (Note: The turret ring bearing must carry the recoil force of the main gun, reduced by the mounting's buffer as well containing the gun breech and associated recoil distance of the gun. The turret and bearing diameter controls the bearing capacity, thus the limit of armament capacity.)

== History ==
=== Britain and France ===
British tank production October 1938 – June 1940
Year	Light	I tank/ Cruiser	Total
Oct–Dec; 1938	169	29	198
1939	734	235	969
Jan–Jun; 1940	140	418	558
Total	1,043	682	1,725

Since infantry tanks were to work at the pace of infantry units which would be attacking on foot, high speed was not a requirement and they were able to carry heavier armour. The first two purpose-designed infantry tanks, the A.11 Matilda Mark I armed with a heavy machine-gun and A.12 Matilda Mark II with a heavy machine gun and 2-pounder anti-tank gun. The Mark I had been ordered in 1938, but it had become clear that a better-armed tank would be needed and the Mark II, was already under design and would be ordered in mid-1938.

The two saw action in the Battle of France where in the Battle of Arras they caused a shock to the German panzer units. Losses of the Mark I in France were not replaced but the Mark II Matilda remained in production.

Infantry and cruiser tanks were expected to engage enemy tanks, hence the use of both the 2-pounder and then 6-pounder on both.

They were followed into service by the Infantry tank Mk III Valentine tank and A.22 Infantry Tank Mk IV Churchill designs. The Valentine proved to be difficult to develop further but the Churchill went through successive variants and served up to the end of the war.

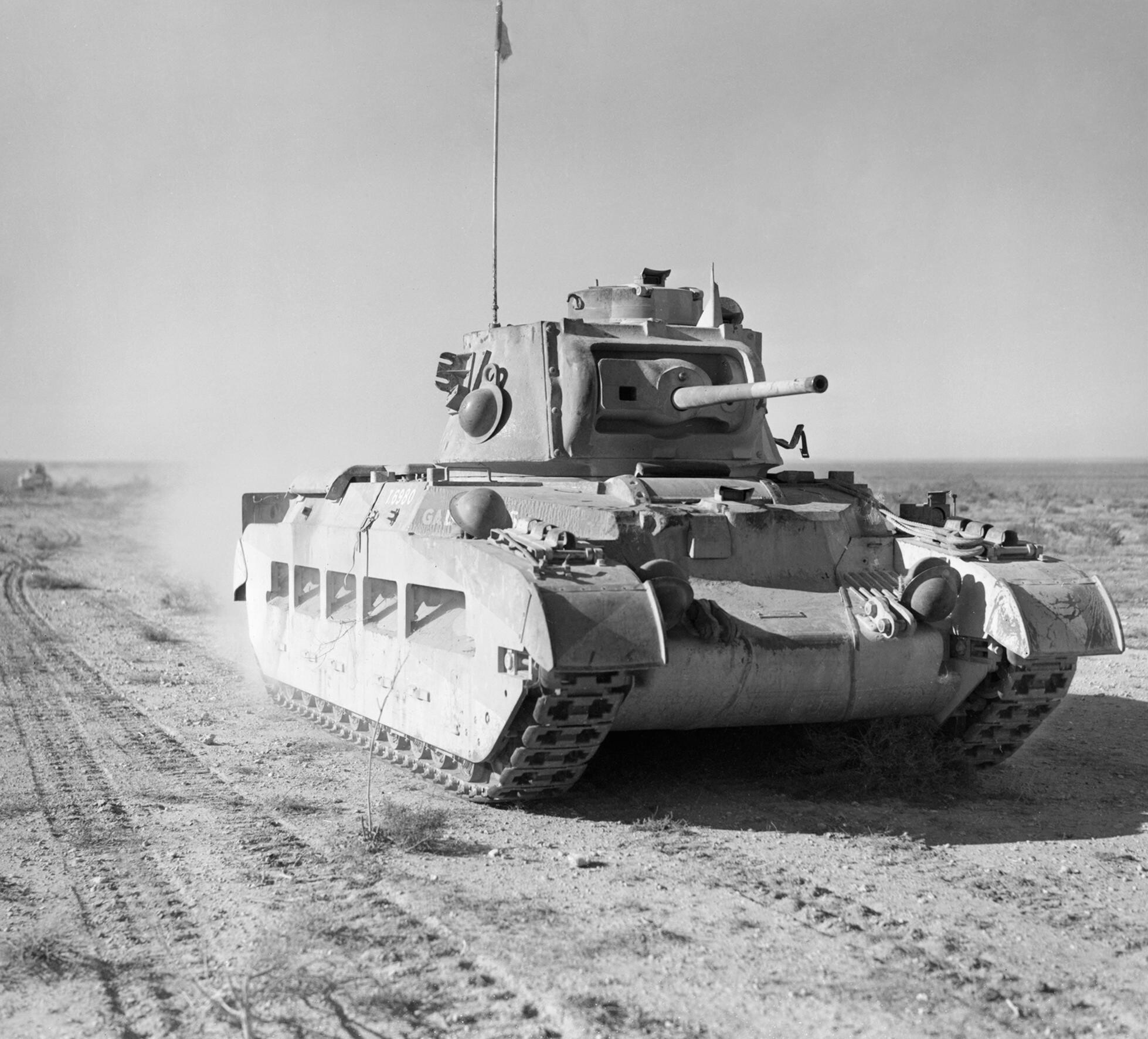
Matilda II in the Western Desert Campaign

As British cruiser tank designs developed into larger vehicles with more powerful engines, they could carry bigger guns and more armour and yet still achieve high speeds. At the end of the war the cruiser tank lineage led to the "universal tank" in the form of the Centurion.

In practice the British did not operate only infantry and cruiser tanks. Lack of production capacity meant the large scale adoption of US medium tanks.

During the inter-war years, the French Army adopted three light tanks in the infantry tank role. These were the Hotchkiss H35, the Renault R35 and the FCM 36. All three had two–man crews and were similar to the Matilda I in terms of size, weight and armour. However, they were better armed, having 37mm guns as well as co-axial machine guns.

In practice, although able to resist hits from other tanks and anti-tank guns, and designed for good, albeit slow, cross-country performance, the separation of tank functions into specialised areas such as infantry and cruiser types was not effective. Invariably the cruisers ended up meeting enemy tanks in combat, while the infantry tanks were the only ones present when a breakthrough was accomplished. The infantry tank idea faded as tank design progressed during the war. It was eventually replaced outright with the general acceptance of the 'universal tank' idea.

== See also ==
- History of the tank
- Tanks in World War I
- Comparison of World War I tanks
- Tanks of the interwar period
- Tanks in World War II
- Cold War Tanks
- Post-Cold War Tanks
- Armoured fighting vehicle
