= Matilda I (tank) =

Tank, Infantry, Mk I, Matilda I (A11)
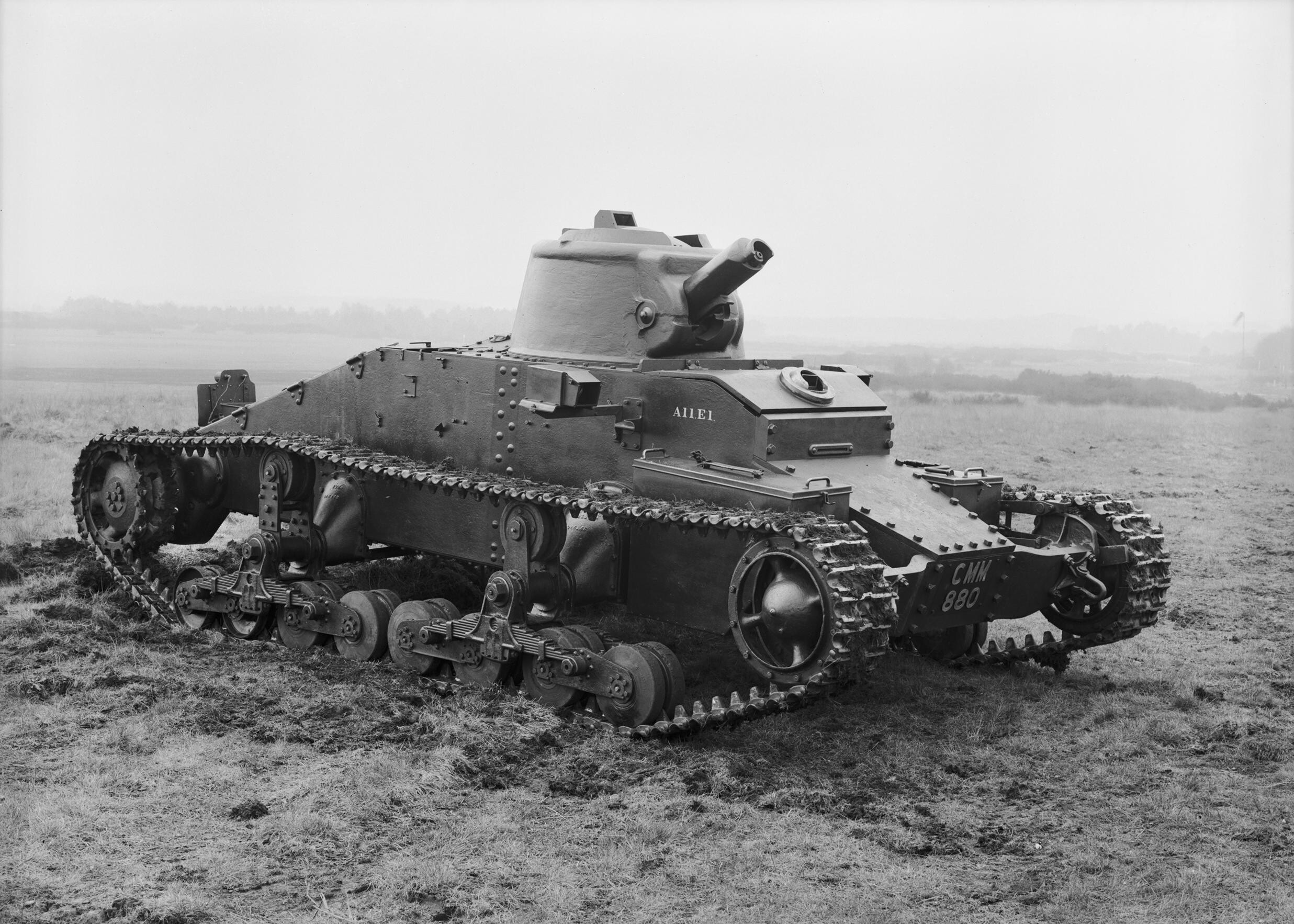
- A11E1 pilot model
- Type: Infantry tank
- Place of origin: United Kingdom

Service history
- In service: 1938–1940

Production history
- Designer: Sir John Carden, Vickers-Armstrongs
- Designed: 1935
- Manufacturer: Vickers-Armstrongs
- Unit cost: £5,000
- Produced: 1937–1940
- No. built: 140

Specifications
- Mass: 11 long tons (12 short tons; 11 t)
- Length: 15 ft 11 in (4.85 m)
- Width: 7 ft 6 in (2.28 m)
- Height: 6 ft 1 in (1.86 m)
- Crew: 2 (commander/gunner, driver)
- Armour: 10–60 mm
- Main armament: Vickers .303 or Vickers .50 machine gun 4,000 rounds
- Secondary armament: none
- Engine: 3.6 Litre V8 Ford Model 79 petrol 70 hp (52 kW)
- Power/weight: 6.36 hp/ton
- Suspension: Sprung bogie
- Operational range: 80 miles (130 km)
- Maximum speed: 8 mph (12.87 km/h), off-road: 5.6 mph (9 km/h)

The Tank, Infantry, Mk I, Matilda I (A11) is a British infantry tank of the Second World War. Despite being slow, cramped and armed with only a single machine gun, the Matilda I had some success in the Battle of France in 1940, owing to its heavy armour which withstood the standard German anti-tank guns. However, it was essentially useless in an attacking sense, as its weak armament made it toothless in combat against enemy armour, and the tank was obsolete before it even came into service. The Battle of France was the only time the Matilda I saw combat. The tank was cheaply built as the British government wanted each of the tanks to be built on a very restricted budget in the build-up to the Second World War. It is not to be confused with the later (more successful) model Tank, Infantry Mk II (A12), also known as the "Matilda II", which took over the "Matilda" name after the Matilda I was withdrawn from combat service in 1940. The two models were completely separate designs.

== Development history ==
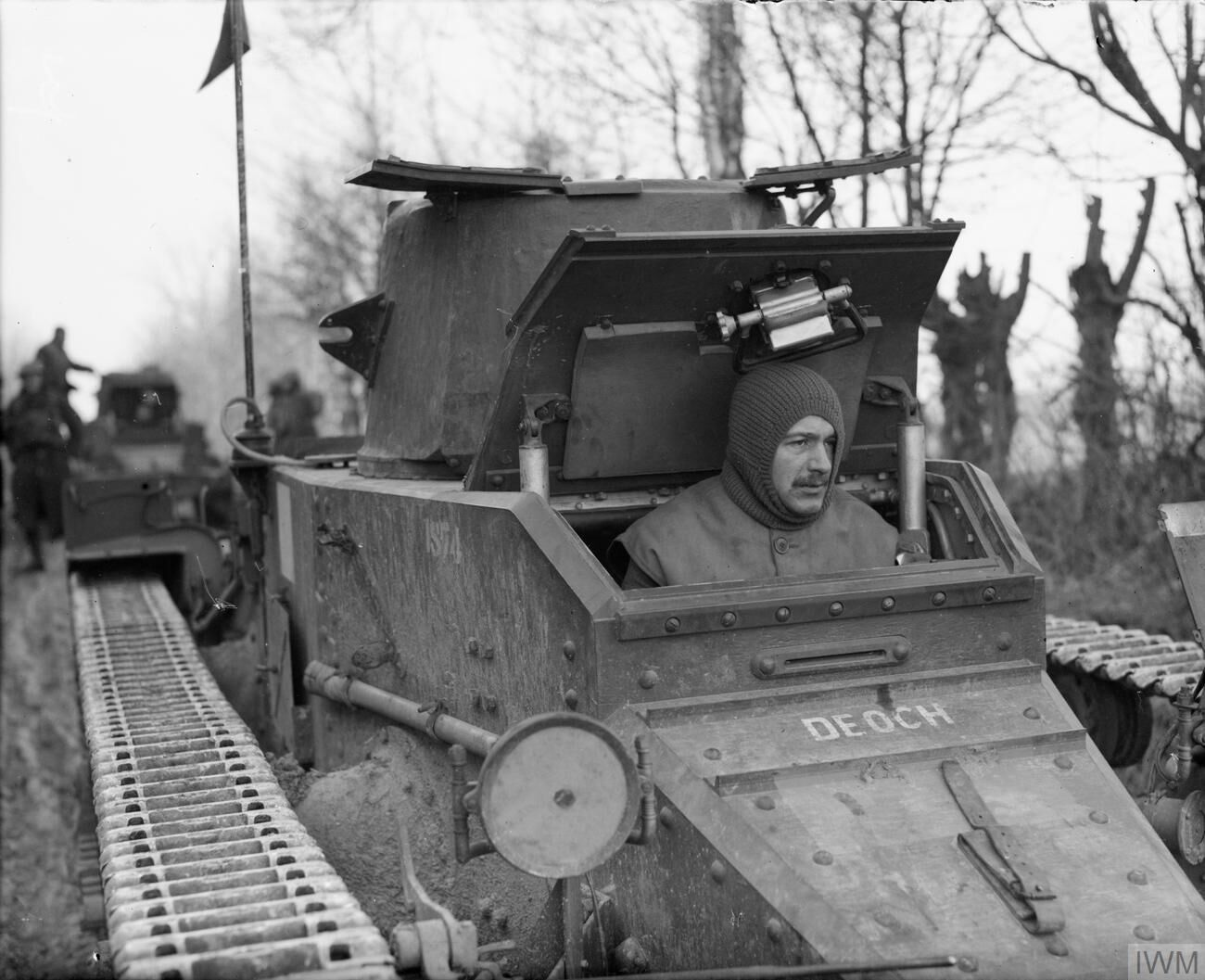
The driver of a Matilda I in France during the winter of 1939–40. This shows the cramped driver's compartment and how the hatch obstructs the gun turret.

The development of the tank began with Sir Hugh Elles, Master General of Ordnance, and Major-General A. E. Davidson, who concurred that a tank design to support infantry attacks was needed. After consulting with Major-General Percy Hobart they decided that large groups of small, lightly armed tanks were needed to overrun enemy positions and approached Sir John Carden at Vickers-Armstrongs Ltd to design and begin work on a tank based on these principles, which began in 1935. The General Staff specification required a cheap tank, requiring the use of already commercially available automotive components. It resulted in a small two-man vehicle with a low hull and a small cast turret. The turret was fitted with a single heavy machine gun, either a .303 (7.7 mm) calibre Vickers machine gun or the larger (12.7 mm) Vickers .50 machine gun. Designed for quick delivery as well as low cost, the A11 used many stock parts from other vehicles: a Ford V8 engine, a Fordson gearbox, a steering mechanism similar to the one used in Vickers light tanks and suspension adapted from the Mk IV Dragon artillery tractor, that was based on the Vickers 6-Ton Tank Model E.

The hull and turret were well protected against contemporary anti-tank weapons but the tracks and running gear were exposed and more vulnerable than on tanks that had protected tracks. The lack of a gun with anti-tank capability severely limited its utility on the battlefield. Besides operating the machine gun, the commander had to direct the driver and operate the radio. There being no room in the turret for the radio, it was placed in the hull; the commander had to duck down inside and lie almost prone to operate it. The driver's position was equally cramped and the turret could not be traversed forward while the driver's hatch was open. The top speed of 8 mph (13 km/h) on roads was thought to be sufficient for supporting an infantry advance.

Essentially, the tank was a First World War tank designed twenty years after its conclusion. Those who designed the tank were influenced by the mistaken belief that combat in a new war would be the same as in World War I, in which tanks were used for breaking through strong, static defensive positions. As a result, the tank was obsolete both in design and in its intended purpose.

General Hugh Elles, the Master-General of the Ordnance, is credited with giving the tank the name Matilda "due to the vehicle's diminutive size and duck-like shape and gait." However, the codename "Matilda" for the project was created for Vickers at the time of drawing up the specification in 1935. The "Tank, Infantry, Mark I" name was an Army Council decision of June 1940.

== Production history ==
The first order of sixty Matilda tanks was placed in April 1937, followed by an order for a further sixty ten days later and another 19 were ordered in January 1939. The tank remained in production until August 1940, with a total of one hundred and forty produced, including the prototype. Some were equipped with the heavier .50 inch Vickers machine gun instead of the .303 inch Vickers machine gun.

== Combat history ==
Matilda I tanks equipped the 4th Battalion and 7th Battalion of the Royal Tank Regiment (RTR). In September 1939, upon the outbreak of the Second World War, the 4th RTR deployed to France with the British Expeditionary Force. They were joined at the start of May 1940 by 7th RTR and together formed the 1st Army Tank Brigade. Apart from light tanks assigned to the various British infantry divisions, this was the only British armoured force on the Continent at the start of the Battle of France on 10 May 1940. The 58 Matilda Is and 16 Matilda IIs spearheaded the counter-attack in the Battle of Arras on 21 May, temporarily discomfiting the 7th Panzer Division under Rommel. The heavy armour of both types of British tank proved to be resistant to the standard German 37 mm anti-tank gun and the attack was only halted by a gun line hastily formed from 105 mm howitzers and 88 mm anti-aircraft guns, personally directed by Rommel. On the following day, only 26 Matilda Is and two Matilda II tanks were still serviceable.

On 23 May, tanks from 7 RTR fought a rearguard action at Souchez before joining the general withdrawal towards Dunkirk. The surviving tanks of both battalions were formed into a composite unit, which fought another counter-attack at La Bassée. Only two tanks reached Dunkirk in the closing stages of Operation Dynamo.

Further south in France, five Matilda Is and a few other tanks which had been in various depots or had arrived as late reinforcements, formed the Divisional Tank Company of the Beauman Division, an improvised formation which had been hastily put together to defend the British logistic bases at Rouen and Dieppe. On 8 June, the tanks supported the force, which was mainly infantry, in their unsuccessful defence of the rivers Andelle and Béthune. The division was subsequently evacuated from Cherbourg during Operation Aerial; although 22 tanks of various types were brought back during these evacuations, there were no infantry tanks among them. A Matilda I was selected by the German Army for evaluation and it was destroyed in the process. After most of the deployed Matilda I tanks were abandoned in France, the 77 Matilda Is left in the United Kingdom were withdrawn for training purposes.

Some recent evidence suggests that Matilda I's captured by the Germans may have seen use as internal security vehicles, probably in Poland.

== Survivors ==
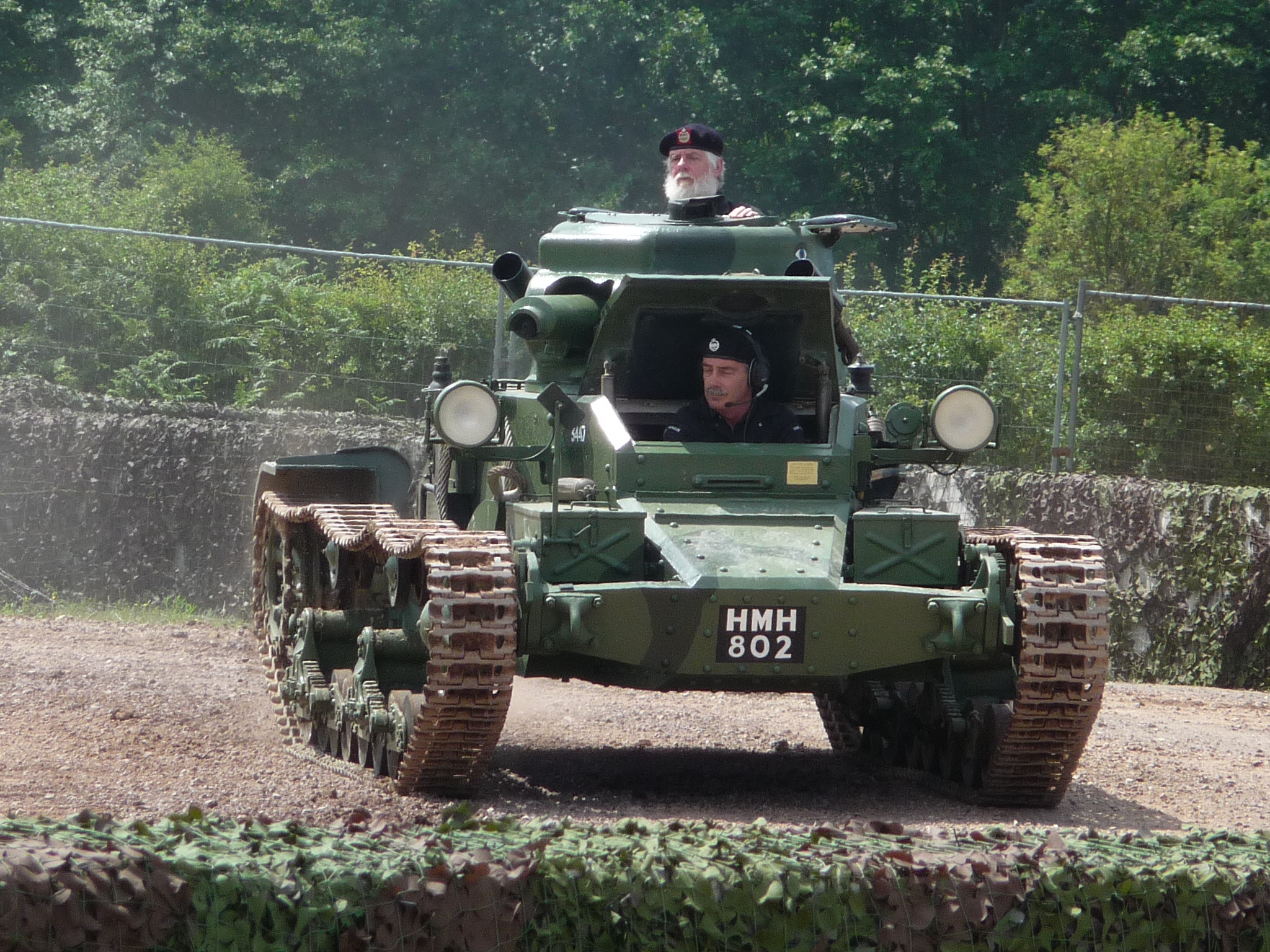
T3447 at The Tank Museum's Tankfest annual display (2009)

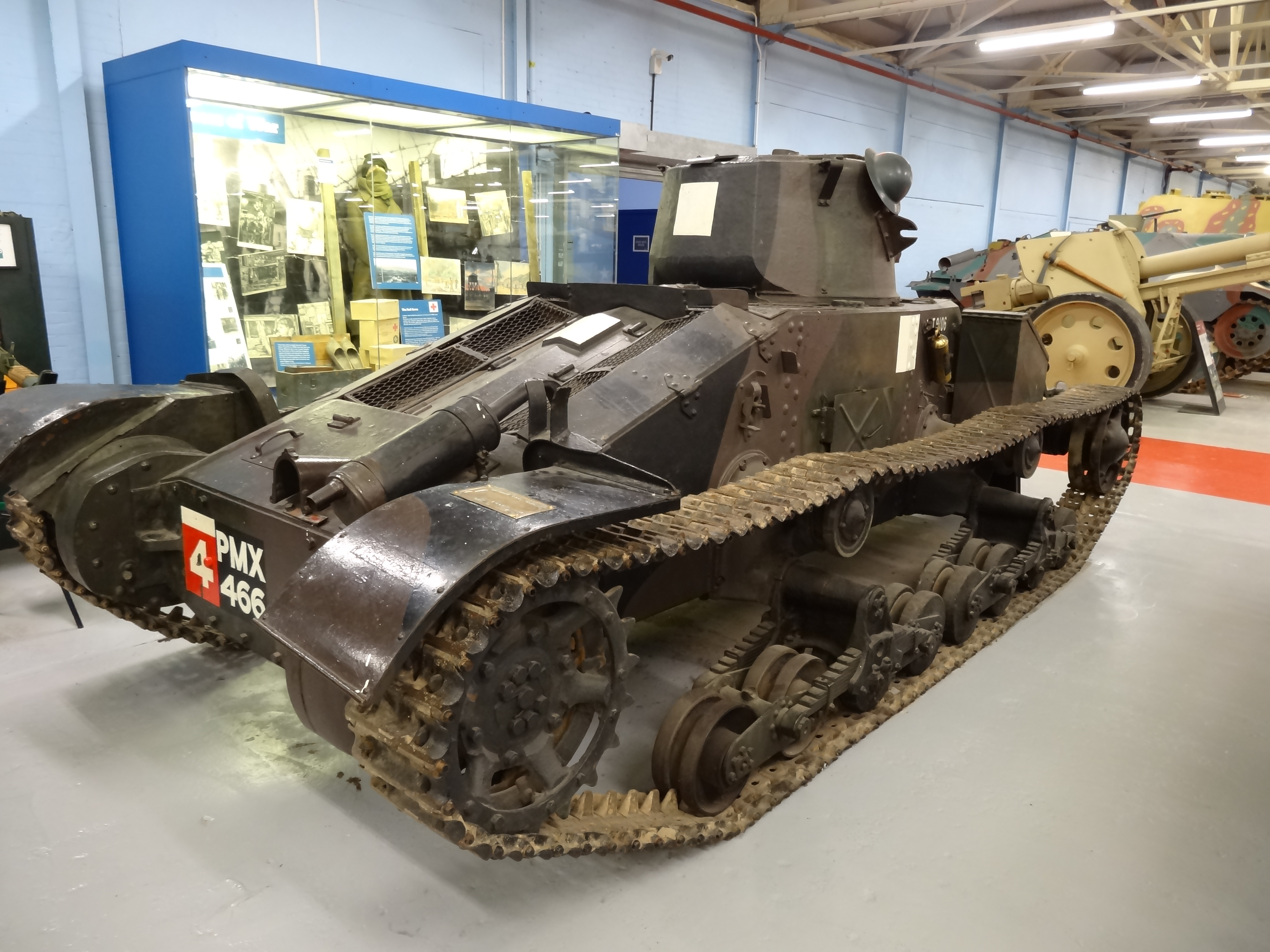
Rear view "T8106".

Matilda I tanks at The Tank Museum

Three surviving Matilda I tanks are preserved at The Tank Museum in the United Kingdom. One (HMH 802, identified as "possibly T3447") is in running condition; it was recovered from Otterburn gunnery range and restored to running condition, although it is powered by an inauthentic engine and gearbox.

The second vehicle was built in March 1940 and restored to running condition in the 1980s. It is painted to represent T8106 a tank of the 4th Royal Tank Regiment in France in May 1940.

A third Matilda I, located to the north of the Vehicle Conservation Centre, is a severely damaged wreck that was used as a gunnery range target.

== See also ==
- FCM 36, a similar, French two–man, infantry tank
- Matilda II infantry tank
- List of tanks of the United Kingdom
- Tanks in the British Army
