= Medium Mark III =

British medium tank prototype

Medium Mk III
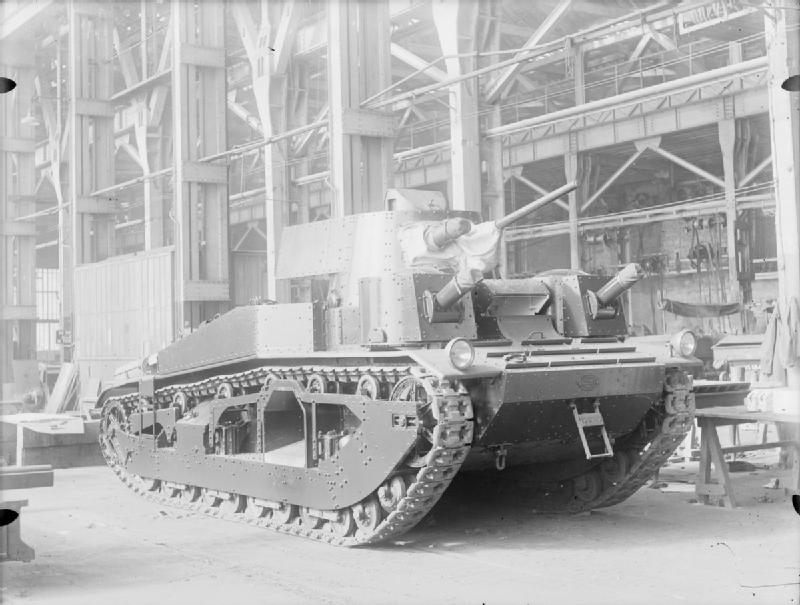
- Type: Medium tank
- Place of origin: United Kingdom

Service history
- Used by: British Army

Production history
- Designed: 1930 (A6 – 1926)
- Manufacturer: Vickers-Armstrong; Royal Ordnance Factory
- No. built: 3

Specifications
- Mass: 16 tons
- Length: 21 ft 6 in (6.55 m)
- Width: 8 ft 9 in (2.67 m)
- Height: 9 ft 2 in (2.79 m)
- Crew: 7
- Armour: 9-14 mm
- Main armament: 3 pounder gun
- Secondary armament: 3 × 0.303 (7.7 mm) Vickers machine guns
- Engine: Armstrong Siddeley air-cooled V8; 180 hp (130 kW)
- Operational range: 120 miles (190 km)
- Maximum speed: 30 mph (48 km/h)

The Medium Mark III was a medium tank developed by the United Kingdom during the Interwar period.

The prototypes of the Medium Mark II were the three A6 also known as "16-tonner" tanks. From the tests of the A6, three Mark IIIs were built and put into service with the British Army but due to the high cost no more were purchased.

== Development ==
=== A6 "Sixteen tonners" ===
In 1926, the British War Office wanted to replace their existing Mark II tanks with a new design. In May the Royal Tank Corps Centre was asked for its opinion, which it submitted in July. One of the requirements was a weight limit of 15.5 long tons (15.7 t), which led to the nickname "16-tonners". Other specifications included that it could transported by rail, a sufficient supply of lubrication oil to match the range of the tank (dictated by the fuel carried), a wireless set, a gun capable of defeating enemy armour at a range of at least 1,000 yd (910 m), fuel tanks external to the main compartments and bottom armour sufficient to withstand heavy machine-gun fire, when exposed climbing a crest. Furthermore the machine should be as silent as possible, as with previous types the engine noise tended to incapacitate the crew.

The War Office added some extra requirements: a separate engine compartment; superior steering capacity and 13 mm (0.51 in) frontal armour with 9 mm (0.35 in) thickness for the other plates.

In September Vickers, given the order to build a prototype, proposed a first design based on the Vickers A1E1 Independent, with the fighting compartment in front and the engine compartment at the back. There would be a central two-man turret with a 3-pounder (1.9 in (47 mm)) gun and a coaxial machine-gun; it was intended to house the commander and a 'special observer', with a cupola for each. In the front of the hull were to be placed two secondary machine-gun turrets, each with twin Vickers machine guns. A third machine-gun turret was intended to be mounted at the back of the vehicle, behind the main turret, which would be armed with an anti-aircraft (AA) weapon. A crew of seven men was needed. Maximum armour would be 13 mm (0.51 in) and basis armour 6.5 mm (0.26 in), limiting the weight to fourteen tons. Riveted plates were used. The total fuel supply would be 120 imp gal (550 L): ten gallons in a small tank inside, gravity feeding the engine; the remainder in external tanks on the fenders. Two engine options were indicated a 120 hp (89 kW) engine would allow for a speed of 14 mph (23 km/h) and a 180 hp (130 kW) engine would raise this to 20 mph (32 km/h).

The result was give the General Staff number A6. In March 1927 a wooden mock-up was presented and after approval a second and prototype were ordered which had to incorporate the new hydraulically operated Wilson epicyclic steering gearbox, the predecessor of the Merrit-Brown gearbox. By June 1928, A6E1 and A6E2 were presented to the Mechanized Warfare Experimental Establishment for trials. Vickers was on this occasion ordered to add armour skirts but keep within the weight limit even if it meant removing armour elsewhere; A6E3 had also been ordered.

A6E1, A6E2 and A6E3 were fitted with an Armstrong Siddeley air-cooled V8 180 hp engine giving a maximum speed of 26 mph (42 km/h). A6E2 was fitted with the Ricardo Compression Ignition 180 hp engine but this was not satisfactory and the Armstrong-Siddeley was refitted. A6E3 was later re-engined with the Thornycroft 6V 500 hp (370 kW), a slow revving marine engine. It was proposed to combine two Rolls-Royce Phantom engines with the Wilson transmission system on the A6E1 but this was rejected on grounds of expense. A6E2 was eventually refitted with the AS V8 180 hp.

The guns were tested in July 1928 and proved that the twin-machine gun arrangement was unworkable. The A6E3, under construction, was fitted with a simplified design with a single machine-gun; it also had single cupola on the centreline of the turret. The AA-turret was removed from A6E1 but the suspension and the gunnery arrangements were distinctly inferior to those of the Mark II. It was decided to discontinue the type and use the three vehicles as test-beds for the automotive parts. In 1929, Vickers submitted three alternative suspension designs which were fitted to the respective prototypes; the one on A6E3 involved a fundamental reconstruction of the hull but none of the designs provided a stable gun platform. Only in 1934 was a satisfactory type was fitted by a specialised firm.

=== Medium Mark III ===
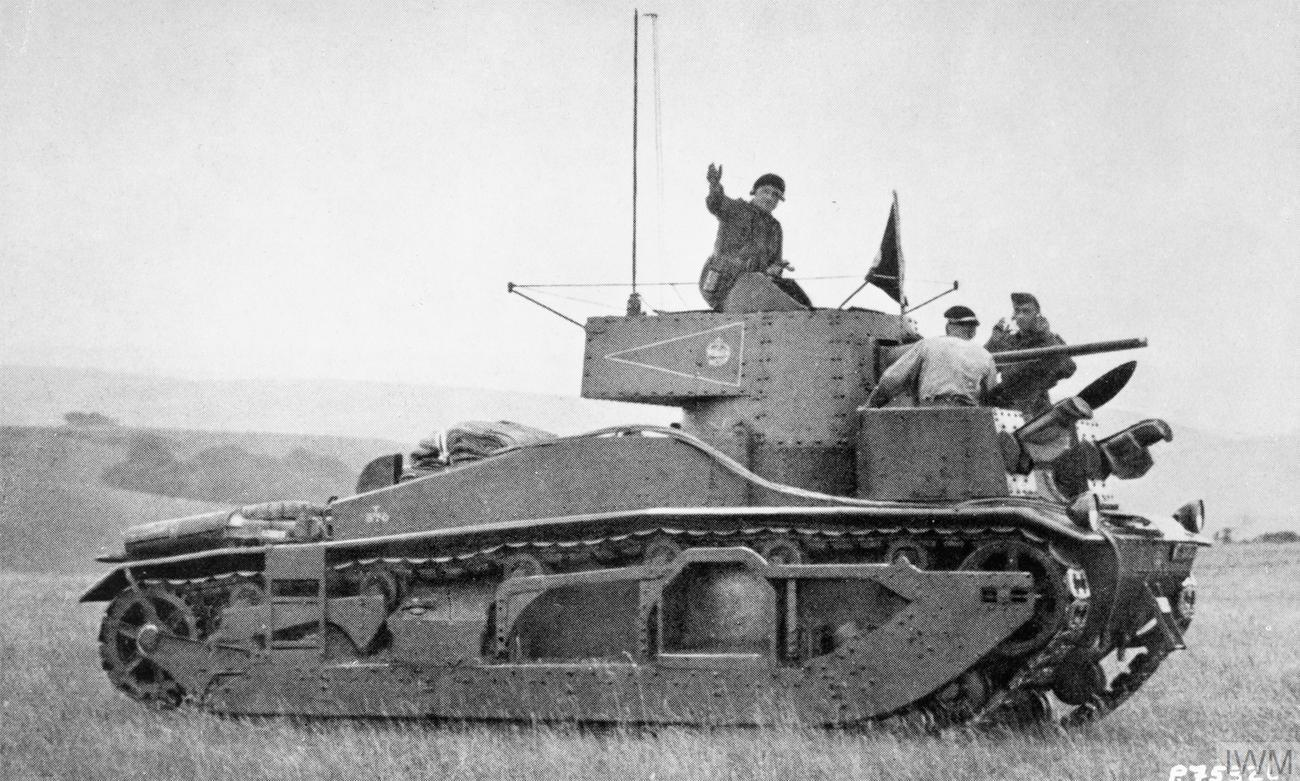
A Medium III in use as a command vehicle

The disappointment of the A6 led to the "Medium Mark III", being ordered in 1928 and constructed from 1930. It was similar to the A6 but featured a new turret and improved armour. The turret had a flat gun mantlet and a bulge at the back to hold the radio set. The secondary machine-gun turrets were moved more to the front to shift the centre of gravity of the vehicle forward to improve its stability and larger brakes were fitted. In 1933 trials were completed of the first two prototypes; the type was reliable and provided a good gun platform. The failings of the suspension continued; even though road speed increased to 30 mph (48 km/h), the bogies were often overloaded during cross-country rides. Three Mark IIIs, E1, E2 and E3, were built, one by Vickers and two by the Royal Ordnance Factory at Woolwich. The third had an improved suspension and in 1934, the vehicles were taken into use by the HQ of the Tank Brigade. No orders followed due to its high price; Medium III E2 was lost to a fire. One Mark III was fitted as a command vehicle with an extra radio aerial around the turret. This was used by Brigadier Percy Hobart for the Salisbury Plain exercises during 1934. In 1938, Thailand purchased the last two examples along with a manufacturing license. Subsequently, and until the end of World War II, Thailand managed to produce around thirty of them.
