= Ordnance QF 3-inch howitzer =

Ordnance QF 3-inch howitzer "3in Howitzer Ordnance Quick Firing"
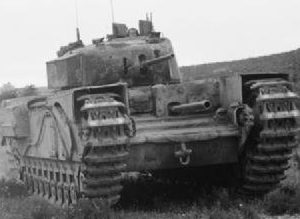
- Mk I Churchill tank with hull-mounted 3-inch howitzer on exercises on Salisbury Plain, January 1942
- Type: Howitzer
- Place of origin: UK

Service history
- Used by: British tanks
- Wars: Second World War

Production history
- Variants: Mark I, Mark IA

Specifications
- Mass: 226 lb (103 kg)
- Length: 78.2 in (1.99 m)
- Barrel length: 75 in (1.9 m)
- Calibre: 3 inches (76.2mm)
- Muzzle velocity: 600 feet per second (180 m/s)
- Effective firing range: 2,000 yards (1,800 m)

Ordnance QF 3 inch howitzer was a howitzer fitted to British cruiser and infantry type tanks of the Second World War so they could fire a smoke shell in "close support" of other tanks or infantry. HE shells were also available.

Earlier British tanks were fitted with a 3.7 in howitzer, based on the QF 3.7-inch mountain howitzer.

== Use ==
The doctrine covering the CS tanks was to "smoke parts of the enemy force" and so isolate them from the battle so the gun tanks could deal with the remainder with a local, if temporary, numerical advantage.

While on most tanks the howitzer replaced the turret armament, on the early marks of the Churchill tank, the howitzer was fitted in the front of the hull which, although it allowed the tank to retain its main gun, limited the range and arc of fire.

== Usage ==
- Matilda II Mark IV CS, equipped at the HQ level, & by the Australians in the South Pacific
- Churchill tank Mk I - mounted low in the front hull - with associated narrowed arc of fire - as supplement to its turret mounted 2-pdr gun. A few Churchill Mk II CS were produced with the howitzer in the turret and the 2pdr in hull.
- Valentine tank Mk III CS - a few produced in New Zealand by taking the howitzer from Matilda II Mk IVCS tanks
- Covenanter tanks - a few of various marks were fitted with the howitzer.
- Crusader Mk I CS and Mk II CS versions were equipped< (65 rounds)
- Staghound Mk II armoured cars, converted from the 37mm-equipped Mk I model and issued to Armoured Car Regiment HQ sections
- A few Close Support versions of the Tetrarch light tank, as well as the Daimler armoured car Mk I (which shared its general turret design with the Tetrarch)

A field artillery version seems to have been developed or under development in 1941 (Note: Its ammunition codes are listed in Field Service Pocket Book, Pamphlet No. 9a, dated 29 October 1941. The ammunition is listed in both the anti-tank and field artillery sections.)

Later in the war a larger QF 95 mm howitzer was employed for the same purpose.

== Specification ==
- Calibre: 3 in (76.2 mm)
- Length of barrel ("tube"): 75 in (1,900 mm) (25 calibres)
- Overall length: 78.2 in (1,990 mm)
- Weight: 256 pounds (116 kg)
- Muzzle velocity: 600 to 700 ft/s (180 to 210 m/s)
- Ammunition
  - Cartridge: 76.2x134R
  - Smoke: 13 1/4 lb (6.0 kg) shot weight
  - HE: 13 7/8 lb (6.3 kg) shot weight
- Range 2,000 to 2,500 yards (1,800 to 2,300 m)
