= Churchill tank =

British heavy infantry tank

Tank, Infantry, Mk IV Churchill
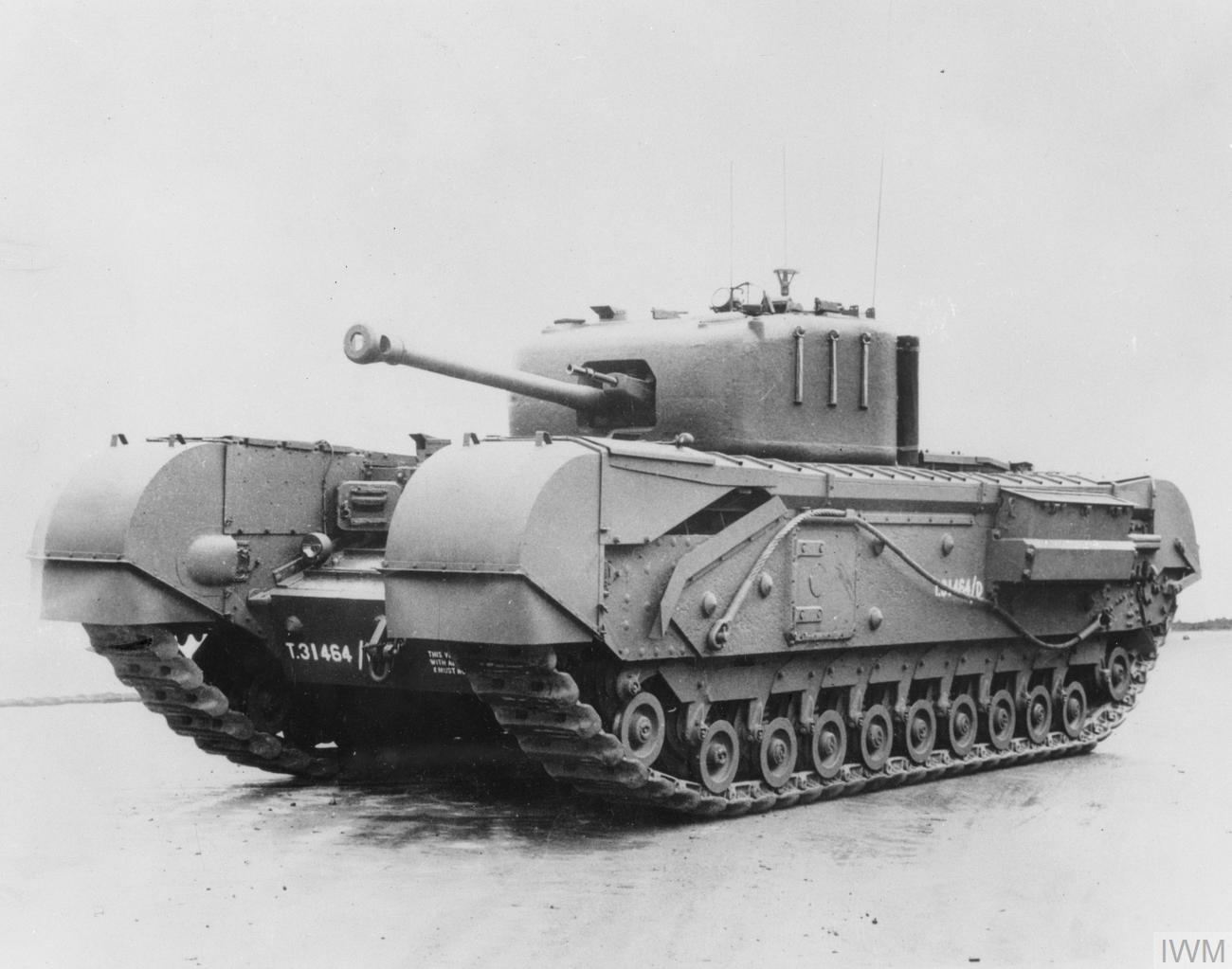
- A Churchill Mark IV tank
- Type: Infantry tank
- Place of origin: United Kingdom

Service history
- In service: 1941–1952 (British Empire) (Note: TOAD Flail in reserve for British Army until mid-1960s)
- Used by: See Operators
- Wars: Second World War, Korean War

Production history
- Designer: Harland & Wolff (A20); Vauxhall Motors (A22)
- Manufacturer: Vauxhall Motors and others
- Produced: 1941–1945
- No. built: ~5,640
- Variants: See Variants

Specifications
- Mass: 39.1 t (38.5 long tons) (Mark I); 40.7 t (40.1 long tons) (Mark VII)
- Length: 24 ft 5 in (7.44 m)
- Width: 10 ft 8 in (3.25 m)
- Height: 8 ft 2 in (2.49 m)
- Crew: 5 (commander, gunner, loader/radio operator, driver, co-driver/hull gunner)
- Armour: Mark I–III: 102 mm hull front, 76 mm hull side, 51 mm hull rear, 89 mm turret front, 76 mm turret side and rear; Mark IV-VI: 102 mm hull front, 76 mm hull side 51 mm hull rear, 127 mm turret front, 76mm turret side and rear; Mark VII–VIII: 152 mm hull and turret front, 95 mm hull sides and turret sides and rear, 51 mm hull rear
- Main armament: QF 2 pounder (Mark I and II); QF 6 pounder (Mark III and IV); QF 75mm (Mark VI and VII); QF 95mm (Mark V and VIII)
- Secondary armament: one coaxial 7.92mm Besa machine gun; 3 inch howitzer (Mark I) or one Besa MG (other marks)
- Engine: Bedford 12-cylinder, 4 stroke, water-cooled, horizontally opposed, L-head petrol engine 325-350 hp (242-261 kW) at 2,200 rpm
- Power/weight: 8.4-8.8 hp (6.1-6.4 kW) / tonne
- Transmission: Merritt-Brown 4-speed constant-mesh epicyclic gearbox
- Suspension: Coiled spring
- Fuel capacity: 150 Imperial Gallons (682 liter)
- Operational range: 75–130 miles (120–210 km)
- Maximum speed: 13.5–16.4 mph (21.7–26.4 km/h)
- Steering system: Triple differential steering in gearbox

The Tank, Infantry, Mk IV (A22) Churchill was a British infantry tank used in the Second World War, best known for its heavy armour, large longitudinal chassis with all-around tracks with multiple bogies, its ability to climb steep slopes, and its use as the basis of many specialist vehicles. It was one of the heaviest Allied tanks of the war.

The origins of the Churchill's design lay in the expectation that war in Europe might be fought in conditions similar to those of the First World War, and thus emphasised the ability to cross difficult ground. The Churchill was hurried into production in order to build up British defences against a possible German invasion. The first vehicles had flaws that had to be overcome before the Churchill was accepted for wide use. After several marks (versions) had been built, a better-armoured specification, the Mark VII, entered service with the British Army. The improved versions performed well in the later stages of the war.

The Churchill was used by British and other Commonwealth forces during the North African, Italian and North-West Europe campaigns. In addition, 344 Churchills were sent as military aid to the Soviet Union during the Second World War and 301 to 344 Churchill tanks saw active service on the Eastern Front.

== Name ==
The Churchill tank was named after John Churchill, 1st Duke of Marlborough. Winston Churchill, Prime Minister at the time of the tank's introduction and a distant descendant of the Duke of Marlborough, told Field Marshal Jan Smuts "That is the tank they named after me when they found out it was no damn good!"

The name only incidentally matched what became the British Army practice of giving service names beginning with C to tanks. Cruiser tanks were given names, such as the contemporary Covenanter, Crusader, Cromwell, Cavalier and Comet but infantry tank naming had no particular pattern.

== History ==
=== A20 ===
Initially specified just before the outbreak of the Second World War, the A20 (its General Staff specification) was to supplement the Matilda II and Valentine infantry tanks. In accordance with British infantry tank doctrine and based on the expected needs of attacking a fixed defensive line, crossing wide trenches, possibly shell-cratered ground similar to First World War trench warfare it was to be immune to the current German 3.7 cm Pak 36 anti-tank guns and carry an unditching beam.

A general outline produced by Woolwich Arsenal was expanded by Belfast shipbuilders Harland & Wolff with advice from the Department of Tank Design. The General Staff had proposed that it was armed with two QF 2 pounder guns, each located in a side sponson with a coaxial Besa machine gun. A third Besa and a smoke projector would be fitted in the front hull. To reduce weight the specification was revised to prefer a maximum armour to the front of 60 mm – sufficient to protect against ordinary shells from the German 37 mm gun. Outline drawings were produced by Woolwich Arsenal based on the A12 Matilda turret – the Director of Mechanisation opposed a turretless design – and the engine and Wilson epicyclic transmission being developed for the A13 Mark III Covenanter tank. Detail design and construction of the A20 was left to Harland & Wolff, who completed four prototypes by June 1940. During the construction period, the armament was reconsidered, including fitting either a 6-pounder gun or the French short 75 mm gun (as used on Char B1) in the forward hull – the former was considered too long (Note: It was thought the muzzle might catch in the ground, and a shortened version would have poor ballistics) and the latter would require redesigning the front of the hull. In the end, a 3-inch howitzer was chosen. The A20 designs were short-lived, however, as at roughly the same time the defeated British Expeditionary Force was evacuated from Dunkirk. While intended for "positional warfare" and direct assaults against fortifications (it was referred to as "Shelled Area Tank", or by the French phrase Char de Fortresse) which had been rendered pointless by the fast pace of German armoured warfare, a heavy tank that could defend the infantry from other tanks was still desired.

At an initial 32 tons, with a 300 hp flat-12 Meadows DAV engine, the A20 had limited power compared to the 16-ton Covenanter. This was a less serious limitation than it might appear, owing to the British distinction between the high-speed cruiser tanks and the slow-speed infantry tanks. Vauxhall, who were already involved as consultants on the suspension, were approached to see if they could build the A20 and one example was sent to Vauxhall at Luton to see if they could provide an alternative engine developing 350 bhp. To this end, they developed a flat-12 petrol engine. For speed of production, this engine was based on a Bedford Vehicles (Vauxhall's commercial vehicle operations) six-cylinder lorry engine, giving rise to its name of "Twin-Six". Although using sidevalves to fit within the space, the engine was developed with high squish pistons, dual ignition and sodium-cooled exhaust valves in Stellite seats to give 350 bhp.

=== A22 ===
With France lost, the scenario of trench warfare in Northern Europe was no longer applicable and the design was revised by Dr H. E. Merritt, (Note: Who was also responsible for the triple differential design of the Merritt-Brown gearbox used in the Churchill.) Director of Tank Design at Woolwich Arsenal, based on the combat witnessed in Poland and France. These new specifications, for the A22 or Infantry Tank Mark IV, were given to Vauxhall in June 1940.

With a German invasion of Britain looking imminent, and the loss of a substantial amount of military vehicles in the evacuation from France, the War Office specified that the A22 had to enter production within a year. By July 1940, the design was completed and by December of that year the first prototypes were completed; in June 1941, almost exactly a year as specified, the first Churchill tanks began rolling off the production line.

A leaflet from the manufacturer was added to the User Handbook, which also described known faults, with work-arounds and what was being done to correct the problem. It said:

Fighting vehicles are urgently required, and instructions have been received to proceed with the vehicle as it is rather than hold up production. All those things which we know are not as they should be will be put right.

Harold Drew of Vauxhall achieved miracles with the Churchill and its Merrit-Brown Tank Gearbox produced by David Brown Limited; "a brilliant design that went into production off the drawing board without adequate prototype testing and had the most disastrous teething troubles" according to Robotham, but British tanks were under-powered, under-gunned and unreliable. At the Tank Board level the Director of Artillery was still extolling the merits of the 2-pounder, and this gun was still fitted to every British tank until March 1942. (Note: introduction of the 6-pounder gun into British use was delayed by the need to re-arm after the loss of equipment and production did not start until October 1941 and some designs in production could not take the larger gun) In a 1942 exercise, one tank had to have its gearbox changed five times.

Because of its hasty development, there had been little testing and the Churchill was plagued with mechanical faults. Most apparent was that the Churchill's engine was underpowered, unreliable, and difficult to access for servicing. Another serious shortcoming was the tank's inadequate armament, the 2 pounder (40 mm) gun, which was improved by the addition of a 3-inch howitzer in the hull to deliver a HE shell, albeit not on a howitzer's usual high trajectory.

Production of a turret to carry the QF 6 pounder gun began in 1941, but lack of supplies of the plate used in an all-welded design led to an alternative cast turret also being produced. These formed the distinction between Mark III and Mark IV.

In August 1942, the Churchill was used offensively for the first time in the Dieppe Raid.

The poor speed of the Churchill nearly caused production to be ceased in favour of the forthcoming Cromwell tank; it was saved by the successful use of the Mk III at the Second Battle of El Alamein in October 1942.

The second major improved Churchill, the Mk VII, was first used in the Battle of Normandy in 1944. The Mk VII improved on the already heavy armour of the Churchill with a wider chassis and the British 75 mm gun, which had been introduced on the Mk VI. It was primarily this variant, the A22F, which served through the remainder of the war. It was re-designated A42 in 1945.

The Churchill was a versatile project and was used in numerous specialist roles.

== Design ==
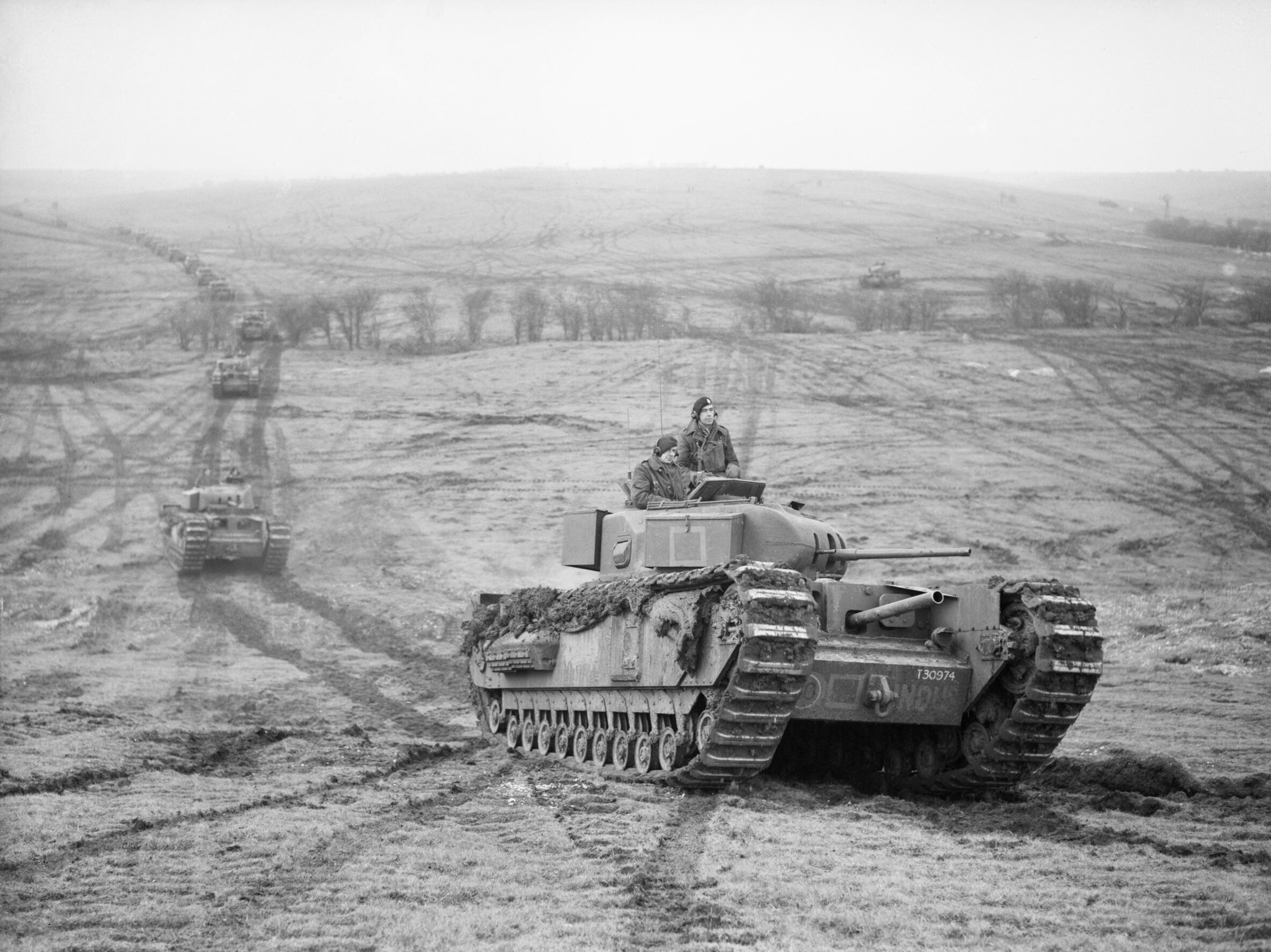
Churchill tanks of 9th Royal Tank Regiment during an exercise at Tilshead on Salisbury Plain, 31 January 1942. Front tank is a Churchill MK. 1

The hull was made up of simple flat plates, which were bolted together in earlier models and were welded in later models. The hull was split into four compartments: the driver's position at the front, then the fighting compartment including the turret, the engine compartment, and the gearbox compartment. The suspension was fitted under the two large "panniers" on either side of the hull, the track running over the top. There were eleven bogies either side, each carrying two 10-inch wheels. Only nine of the bogies normally took the vehicle weight, the front coming into play when the vehicle nosed into the ground or against an obstacle, the rear acting in part as a track tensioner. Due to the number of wheels, the tank could survive losing several without much in the way of adverse effects as well as traversing steeper terrain obstacles. As the tracks ran around the panniers, escape hatches in the side could be incorporated into the design. These were retained throughout the revisions of the Churchill and were of particular use when the Churchill was adopted as the AVRE.

The Bedford Vehicles engine was effectively two engines in horizontally opposed configuration ("flat twelve") on a common crankshaft. There were four Solex carburettors each on a separate manifold that fed three cylinders formed as a single cylinder head. The elements of the engine and ancillary components were laid out so they could be reached for maintenance through the engine deck covers. Air for the engine was drawn from the fighting compartment through air cleaners. Cooling air was drawn into the engine compartment through louvres on the sides, across the radiators and through the engine compartment by a fan driven by the clutch. This fan blew the air over the gearbox and out the rear of the hull. By opening a flap between the fighting compartment and the engine compartment, this airflow could be used to remove fumes produced by firing the armament. The 1,296 cu in (21.238 L) capacity engine was rated at 325 bhp (242 kW) at 2,200 rpm, delivering 960 lb⋅ft (1,300 N⋅m) torque over an engine speed range from 800 to 1,600 rpm. With the introduction of the Churchill Mk VII and VIII, the engine was uprated to 350 bhp (260 kW) at 2,200 rpm, presumably to counteract the increased weight.

The gearbox featured a regenerative steering system that was controlled by a tiller bar instead of the more commonplace brake levers or, as with the German Tiger I heavy tank, a steering wheel. The tiller was connected, with servo assistance, hydraulically to the steering brakes. The Churchill was also the first tank to utilise the Merritt-Brown triple differential gearbox, which allowed the tank to be steered by changing the relative speeds of the two tracks; this effect became more pronounced with each lower gear, ultimately allowing the tank to perform a "neutral turn" when no gear was engaged, where it could fully pivot within its own length and thus rotate in place. There were final reduction gears, of the planetary type, in the driving wheels. Although capable of 17 mph (27 km/h) the noise at that speed was so great that the Churchill was limited to 10 to 12 mph (16 to 19 km/h) by not using the highest gear.

The first turrets were of cast construction and were rounded in shape, providing sufficient space to accommodate the relatively small 2 pounder gun. To fulfil its role as an infantry support vehicle, the first models were equipped with a 3-inch howitzer in the hull in a layout very similar to the French Char B1. This enabled the tank to deliver a useful high-explosive capability while retaining the anti-tank capabilities of the 2 pounder. However, like other multi-gun tanks, it was limited by a poor fire arc—the track horns limiting traverse—and elevation of only 9°. Despite the length of the gun the muzzle velocity was only 600 ft/s (180 m/s). (Note: The howitzer could fire smoke or HE but only smoke was carried as the range of the HE round was short and firing smoke was the purpose of the close support (CS) gun) The Mark IVA (retrospectively the Churchill Mk II) dispensed with the howitzer (there had been only enough guns to equip 300 tanks) and replaced it with a bow machine gun and on the Mk III, the 2 pounder was replaced with the 6 pounder, significantly increasing the tank's anti-tank capabilities. The tank underwent field modification in North Africa with several Churchills being fitted with the 75 mm gun of destroyed M4 Shermans. These "NA75" variants were used in Italy. The use of the 75mm increased despite its worse anti-tank performance when compared to the 6pdr due to the HE rounds used by the 75mm being considerably more effective when used in infantry support roles.

Churchills made use of the Vickers Tank Periscope MK.IV. In the Mark VII, the driver had two periscopes as well as a vision port in the hull front that could be opened. The hull gunner had a single periscope as well as the sighting telescope on the BESA machine gun mounting. In the turret, the gunner and loader each had single periscope and the commander had two fitted in his hatch cupola.

The armour on the Churchill, often considered its most important feature, was originally specified to a minimum of 16 millimetres (0.63 in) and a maximum of 102 millimetres (4.0 in); this was increased with the Mk VII to a range from 25 millimetres (0.98 in) to 152 millimetres (6.0 in). Though this armour was considerably thicker than its rivals (including the German Tiger I tank, but not the Tiger II) it was not sloped, reducing its effectiveness. Earlier models were given extra armour by the expedient of welding on extra plates. On the Mark VII, the hull front armour was made up of a lower angled piece of 5.5 in (140 mm), a nearly horizontal 2.25 in (57 mm) plate and a vertical 6 inch plate. The hull sides, were, for the most part, 3.75 in (95 mm). The rear was 2 in (51 mm) and the hull top 0.525 in (13.3 mm). The turret of the Mark VII was 6 in (150 mm) to the front and 3.75 in (95 mm) for the other sides. The turret roof was 0.79 (20 mm) thick. Plate was specified as IT 80, the cast sections as IT 90.

The A22F, also known as "Heavy Churchill", was a major revision of the design. The most significant part was the use of welding instead of riveted construction. Welding had been considered earlier for the Churchill but, until its future was assured, this was no more than testing techniques and hulls at the firing ranges. What welding reduced in the overall weight (estimates were around 4%), the thicker armour of the A22F made up for. Welding also required fewer man-hours in construction. The hull doors changed from square to round which reduced stresses. A new turret went with the new hull. The sides, which included a flared base to protect the turret ring, were a single casting while the roof, which did not need to be so thick, was a plate fitted to the top.

Since the engines on the Churchill were never upgraded, the tank became increasingly slow as additional armour and armament was equipped and weight increased; while the Mk I weighed 40 long tons (41,000 kg) and the Mk III weighed 39 long tons (39,630 kg), the Mk VII weighed 40 long tons (40,640 kg). This caused a reduction in the tanks' maximum speed from its original 26 km/h (16 mph) down to 20.4 km/h (12.7 mph).

Another problem was the tank's relatively small turret that prevented the use of powerful weapons; definitive versions of the tank were armed with either the QF 6-pounder or the derivative QF 75 mm gun. The 6-pounder was effective against armoured vehicles, but less so against other targets; the 75 mm was a better all-round weapon, but lacked in effectiveness against armour. Although the Churchills with their 6-pounders could outgun many contemporary German medium tanks (like the Panzer IV with the short-barrel 75 mm gun, and the Panzer III armed with the 50 mm gun) and the thick armour of all Churchill models could usually withstand several hits from any German anti-tank gun, in the later years of the war the German Panther tank had a 75 mm high-velocity cannon as its main armament along with increased protection, against which the Churchills' own guns often lacked sufficient armour penetration to fight back effectively.

The Churchill had many variations, including many specialised modifications. The most significant change to the Churchill was that it was up-gunned from 2-pounder to 6-pounder and then 75 mm guns over the course of the war. By the war's end, the late model Churchill Mk VII had exceptional amounts of armour – considerably more than the German Tiger tank. However, the firepower weakness was never fully addressed. The Mark VII turret that was designed for the 75 mm gun was of composite construction – cast with top and bottom plates welded into position.

While it had weaknesses, the Churchill could cross terrain obstacles that most other tanks of its era could not. This capacity frequently proved useful, especially during the fighting in Normandy. One action in Normandy where the tank's ability to surmount obstacles was found to be of value was the capture of Hill 309 on 30/31 July 1944 (Operation Bluecoat) conducted by VIII Corps.

== Production ==
The Churchill tank was produced with Vauxhall as the design parent. Subcontracted work on some tanks was provided by Whessoe Foundry & Engineering, Metropolitan‑Cammell Carriage & Wagon, Babcock & Wilcox, Newton, Chambers & Company and the Gloucester Railway Carriage & Wagon Company; the latter two produced some complete vehicles. Other contractors produced hulls and turrets which went to Vauxhall, Charles Roberts & Co, and Dennis Brothers for final assembly.

Churchill tank production
Model	Years	Notes	Production
Churchill I	1941		303
Churchill II	1941–42		1,127
Churchill III	late 1942		675 or 692
Churchill IV	1943	(together with Churchill V)	1,622
Churchill V	1943	(together with Churchill IV)	241
Churchill VI	early 1944	(improved Churchill IV)	200
Churchill VII	1944	(together with Churchill VIII)	1,400
Churchill VIII	1944	(together with Churchill VII)	200

In March and April 1942, Vauxhall stopped producing new tanks. Together with Broom & Wade (at High Wycombe) they started rebuilding earlier tanks; about 700 of the first 1,000 built were included in this scheme. The reworked tanks got an "R" as a suffix to their WD number. Changes to the hull air intakes and the full length mudguards were the most obvious changes.

Turrets for the earliest Marks were single piece castings. One thousand were supplied from the United States: 600 complete from General Steel and 400 from American Steel Foundries that were finished by other companies before shipping to UK.

== Service history ==
=== World War II ===
==== Dieppe Raid ====
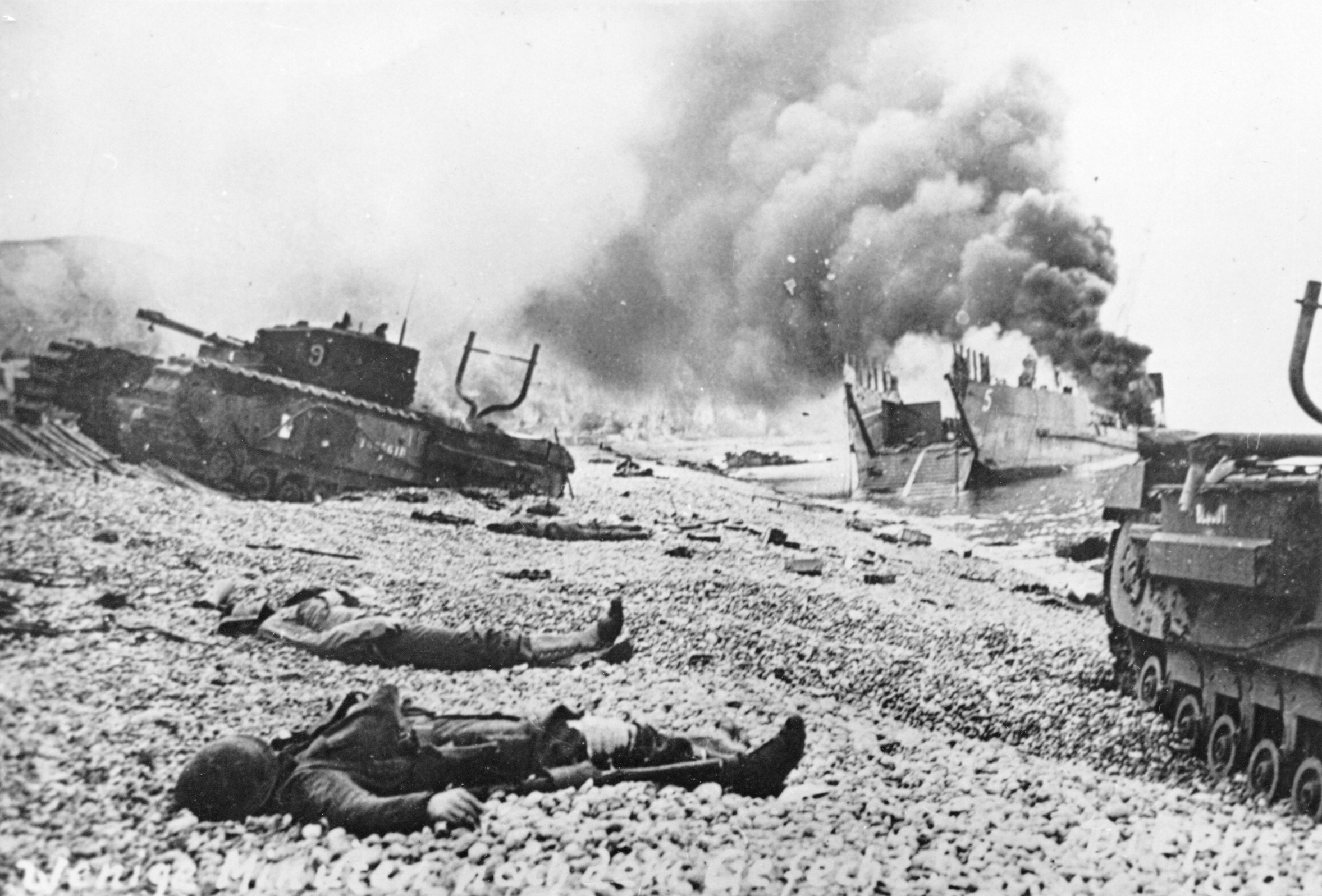
Churchill tanks on the Dieppe beach. The Y-shaped pipes on the rear decking are exhaust pipe extensions to allow deep wading.

The Churchill first saw combat on 19 August 1942, in the Dieppe Raid, planned to temporarily take control of the French port of Dieppe using a force of only about 6,000 troops, mostly drawn from Canadian units. The operation, codenamed Jubilee, would test the feasibility of opposed landings. Nearly 60 Churchill tanks from the 14th Army Tank Regiment (The Calgary Regiment (Tank)) (Note: They replaced the 48th Royal Tank Regiment) were allocated to support the infantry and commandos; they would be put ashore by Landing Craft Tank vessels, along with the supporting engineers. Some problems were anticipated and allowed for: waterproofing of the hulls, canvas carpets ("Bobbin") to aid the tanks crossing the short stretch of shingle beach, engineer teams to demolish road blocks and a few of the tanks were fitted with flame-throwers. The tanks, a mix of Mark I with hull howitzers, Mark II (three with flamethrowers) and Mark III (some with Bobbin), were expected to enter the town and reach a nearby airfield before retiring back to the beach to be taken off by the LCTs. Half of the tank force would be held in reserve offshore.

In the event, the German defences were stronger than expected. The beach was chert which included larger stones than the anticipated shingle: according to history professor Hugh Henry, the German defenders had previously considered it impassable to tanks. Only the 30 Churchills in the first two waves of 10 LCTs were landed on the beach under heavy fire: the latter two waves were turned away. One Churchill was trapped in its LCT by shellfire. Of the 29 remaining (eight Mark I/IIs, three Oke flamethrower tanks, and 18 Mark IIIs), two sank en route to shore, and 11 were immobilized on the beach due to a combination of the chert shingle and indirect fire. Only 15 would get off the beach and over the sea wall onto the Dieppe promenade. Although these tanks were effective in engaging the defenders in the town's buildings, their further progress was blocked by concrete defences; the engineer demolition teams – killed or pinned on the beach – had not been able to accompany the tanks. Ten of these Churchills were able to return to the beach once the withdrawal had been signalled but they could not be evacuated. According to Henry, no Churchills were penetrated by German anti-tank fire while still manned. These surviving tank crews fought to cover the withdrawal of the infantry from the beach, and almost all were captured with their vehicles, having exhausted their main gun ammunition. The tank regiment's commanding officer, Lieutenant-Colonel Johnny Andrews, was among those killed in action. Nearly 70% of the Canadians were killed, injured or captured and none of the raid's objectives were met other than the secret raid on the radar station on a headland.

==== North Africa ====
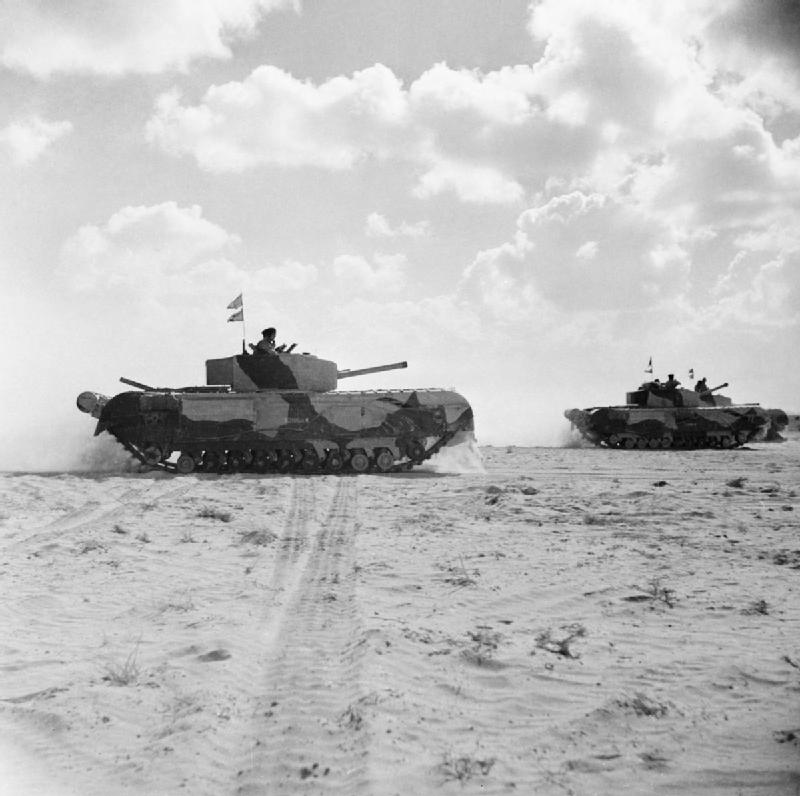
Churchill Mark III tanks of 'Kingforce' during the Second Battle of El Alamein

Two Mark II had been sent to North Africa for trials and they were joined by six Mk III Churchills (with the 6 pounder) to form the Special Tank Squadron commanded by Major Norris King. They saw action in the Second Battle of El Alamein in October 1942. This detachment, called "Kingforce", supported the attack of 7th Motor Brigade first with three tanks at Kidney Ridge (where one was hit "repeatedly" by anti-tank gun fire (including "friendly fire" from a British gun) and another took "a lot of punishment"), then the remaining five at Tell-el-Aqqaqir. The Churchills were fired on many times by Italian and German anti-tank guns, but only one was knocked out and partially caught fire. One tank was said to have been hit up to 80 times.

Kingforce, formed to test whether the Churchills could operate in Africa, was considered too slow to participate in the chase after the retreating Axis, sent back to Alexandria and disbanded after El Alamein. This seems unlikely, as firstly the Churchill has the same top speed as the Valentine tanks that the 8th Army did use on this advance and secondly; the tanks would have been loaded onto tank transporters such as the Scammell Pioneer to transport them any strategic distance in a reasonable time, without the fuel consumption and wear and tear of driving tanks hundreds of kilometres. It is more likely that Kingforce was disbanded as the trial was limited only to the battle of El Alemain and when that ended, the six tanks of Kingforce were earmarked to go to a Brigade that was operating Churchill tanks, of which the 8th Army had no such brigades. The 25th Army Tank Brigade of three regiments was sent to Africa, and went into action in February 1943 during the Tunisian campaign. (Note: North Irish Horse, 51st Royal Tank Regiment and 142nd Regiment Royal Armoured Corps) It was followed by 21st Army Tank Brigade.

Churchill tanks took part in containing the German offensive of Operation Ochsenkopf in February – March 1943. At the battle of Steamroller Farm, two Churchill Mk III tanks of 51 RTR got ahead of their squadron. They came across an entire German transport column, which they ambushed and completely shot up before they rejoined. The result was the destruction of two 88 mm, two 75 mm and two 50 mm, four lesser anti-tank guns, 25 wheeled vehicles, two 3-inch mortars, two Panzer III tanks and infliction of nearly 200 casualties.

A Churchill tank in a hull down defensive position made a particular contribution to Allied success. In one encounter, on 21 April 1943, during the start of the Battle of Longstop Hill, a Churchill tank of the 48th Royal Tank Regiment got the better of a German Tiger I heavy tank. A 6 pounder shot from the Churchill lodged between the Tiger's turret and turret ring, jamming the turret and injuring the German crew. They abandoned the Tiger, which was subsequently captured by the British. Known as Tiger 131, this was the first Tiger captured by the Western Allies and was particularly useful for intelligence. Tiger 131 has since been restored to full working condition and is now on display at The Tank Museum in Dorset, UK. As of late 2025, it is the only working Tiger tank in the world.

==== Italy ====
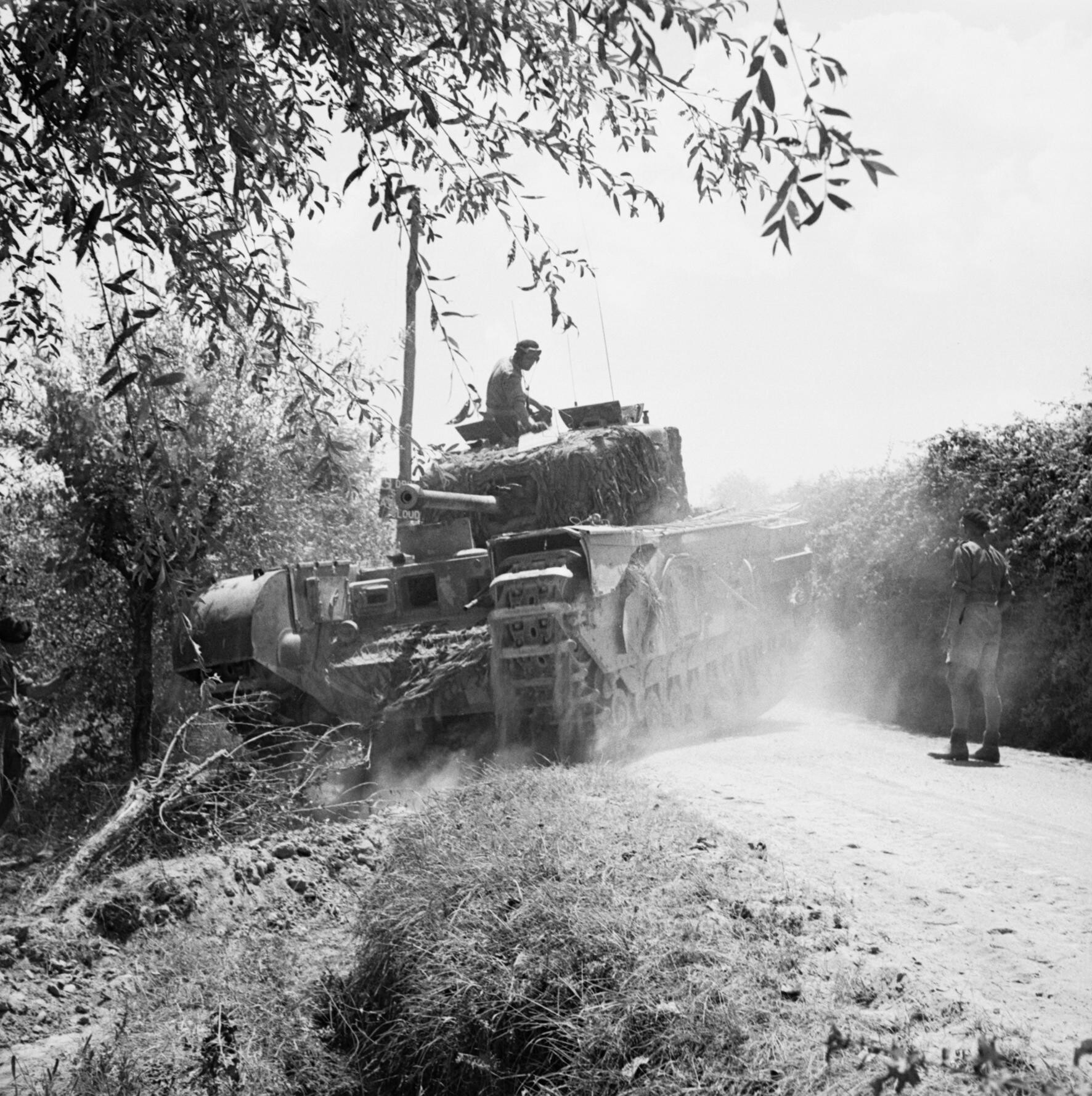
North Irish Horse Churchill advancing towards Florence, 23 July 1944

Churchill tanks were not initially used in the Italian mainland in 1943. There were six regiments with Churchills in Tunisia, these may have been kept out because Montgomery preferred the Sherman or because their 6-pdr guns were not considered suitable for the fighting in Italy. Churchills did land in Italy in April/May 1944 with 75mm gun armed Churchills arriving later. As the mainstay of the Tank Brigades, which operated in support of the infantry, Churchill units were in operation more often than other tank units.

The Churchill NA75s, Churchill Mark IVs converted to carry the US 75 mm gun, were used in Italy. As the Churchill proved to be a better gun platform than the Sherman, the effective range of the 75 mm was increased.

==== North-West Europe ====
Churchills saw widespread action in Normandy during the Battle of Hill 112 and Operation Bluecoat, as well as subsequent operations in the Low Countries and into Germany, such as the fighting in the Reichswald during Operation Veritable.

The Churchill was able to cross the muddy ground and force through the forests of the Reichswald; a contemporary report expressed the belief that no other tank could have managed the same conditions.

==== Burma and India ====
A single Churchill, possibly a Mk V, was trialled in Burma in 1945. It was operated by the 3rd Dragoon Guards (Carabiniers) from the end of April 1945 for about a month. Although it proved impossible to bring the Churchill into action, on approach marches the tank proved at least the equal to the M3 Lee then in service.

The 254th Indian Tank Brigade returned to India from Burma, arriving at Ahmednagar during July 1945. The brigade immediately began conversion from the Lee to the Churchill, the intention being for the newly equipped brigade to return to operations in October 1945. At the time, it was assumed that the war against Japan would continue and that the new battleground would be Malaya. Although a small number of tanks were delivered, and some training undertaken, the end of the war against Japan meant that the conversion was not completed. At the end of September, the 254th Indian Tank Brigade was reassigned and posted away from Ahmednagar. All the Churchills delivered up to that point were returned to the Ordnance Depot at Kirkee (Khadki) by the end of November–early December 1945. Of the three regiments (battalions) involved, the 3rd Dragoon Guards accompanied the 254th Brigade when posted away while the 149th Regiment Royal Armoured Corps and the 150th Regiment Royal Armoured Corps were eventually disbanded at Ahmednagar on 28 February 1946, the majority of personnel already having been repatriated to the United Kingdom or posted to other units.

==== Eastern front ====
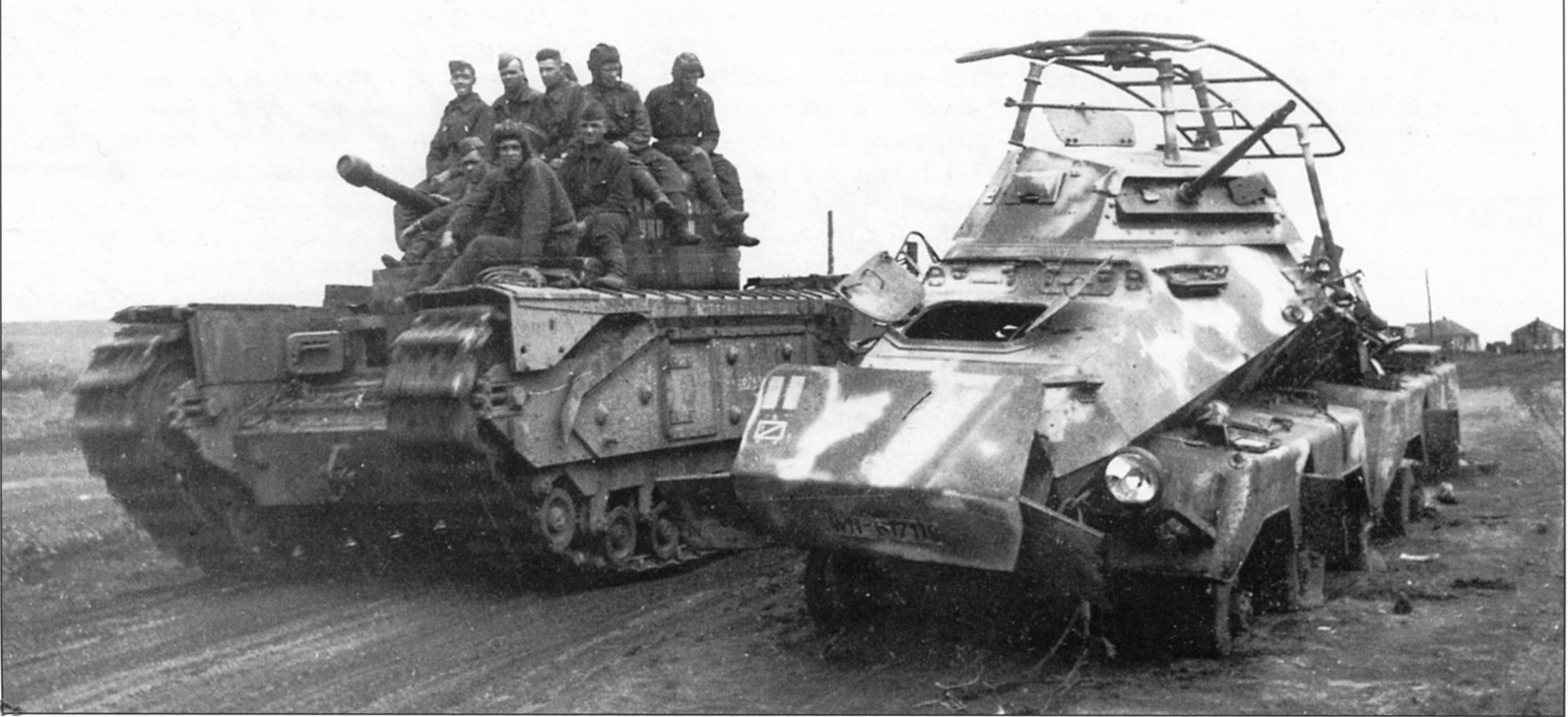
A Soviet Churchill Mk IV passes a knocked-out German Sd.Kfz 232 (8-Rad) armoured car at the Fourth Battle of Kharkov in 1943

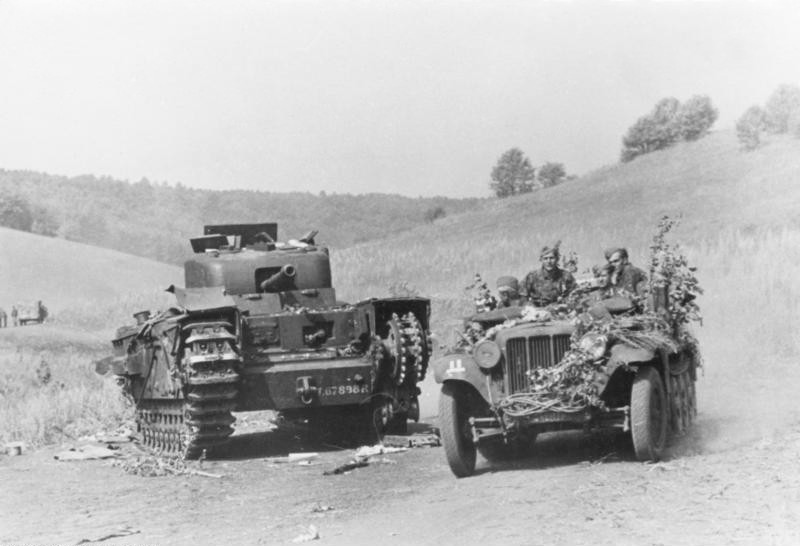
A captured Soviet Churchill Mk IV, 1943

The Soviet Union was sent 301 Churchill tanks (45 Mk II, 151 Mk III and 105 Mk IV) as part of the Lend-Lease programme. 43 of them (19 Mk II and 24 Mk III) were lost en route on the Arctic Convoys. Delivery of the first 25 units took place in May 1942, but adoption by the Red Army was delayed because of the 30 that were sent by June 1942, 20 had been lost in shipping.

The Churchill was not very popular in Soviet service. Soviet operators disliked the 2 pdr gun of the Mk II version (also used by Matildas and Valentines shipped to the USSR), and the tank was considered "sufficient" by inspectors, who warned that it was "unrefined" in terms of both design and production and would require constant maintenance in the field. Like Soviet heavy tanks, they were assigned to separate breakthrough tank regiments tasked with infantry support.

Churchills were used at the Siege of Leningrad, as well as in the Battle of Stalingrad (47th and 48th regiments of heavy tanks – 42 Churchills), including during Operation Koltso. In 1943, they were employed during the Battle of Kursk, during which the Soviet 5th Guards Tank Army used Churchills in the Battle of Prokhorovka (15th and 36th regiments of heavy tanks – 42 Churchills), and Churchills became the first Soviet tanks to enter Orel during Operation Kutuzov. They were used in the Fourth Battle of Kharkov and the Second Battle of Kiev as well. Churchills were used in other battles until 1944 (82nd regiment of heavy tanks).

The Churchills were also employed at the Finnish front. They took part in the capture of Viipuri as part of the Vyborg–Petrozavodsk offensive in 1944. The Finnish forces reported having destroyed "three heavy tanks of previously unknown type", which after the war were recognized as Churchill III tanks.

==== Australian testing ====
In mid-1944, at the request of Britain's War Office, the Churchill was tested by the Australian Army, along with the M4 Sherman. The results were to be used to determine any modifications required for use in the tropics; Matildas were used as a reference point in the tests at Madang, New Guinea. The Churchill was found to be, overall, superior to the other tanks for jungle warfare. However, only 46 of the 510 Churchills ordered by Australia were delivered by the end of the war.

=== Korean War and after ===
During the Korean War, the United Kingdom deployed 20 Churchill tanks from C Company, 7th Royal Tank Regiment, and arrived on the Korean Peninsula along with its first-sent troops in November 1950. Most of these tanks were Mk. VII (A42) 'Crocodile' flame-throwing tanks; despite being a flame-thrower, they were used like a regular tank. In addition, the Assault Vehicle Royal Engineers (AVRE), Armoured Recovery Vehicle (ARV), and Bridgelayers variants were brought together.

In action against the Chinese, they mostly fought as gun tanks, for example in the Third Battle of Seoul. To restore the 1st Battalion, Royal Northumberland Fusiliers' position during the defence of Seoul, Brigadier Thomas Brodie of the 29th Infantry Brigade sent four Churchill tanks as reinforcement; their contributions to the battle were widely praised by British and American historians.

The Churchill tank was briefly operated from 1950 to 1951, and withdrew in October 1951 from Korea. All Churchills were retired from the British Army in 1952.

=== Ireland ===
The Irish Army took delivery of three Churchill Mk VI tanks in 1948 and a fourth in 1949. These were rented from the British War Office as trials vehicles until 1954, when they were purchased outright. This purchase was despite the fact that the supply and transport corps workshops, which maintained them, had reported that spares had all but run out. Experiments were carried out involving replacing the existing Bedford engine with a Rolls-Royce Merlin engine salvaged from an Irish Air Corps Supermarine Seafire aircraft on one tank. The experiment was a success, but not followed up on the other tanks although the reasons are not recorded. By 1967, only one Churchill remained serviceable, and by 1969 all were retired. One remains preserved in the Curragh Camp.

== Variants ==
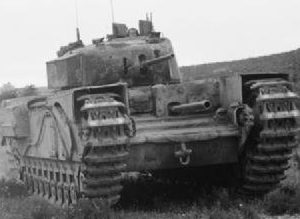
Churchill Mark I with hull-mounted 3-inch howitzer in exercises on Salisbury Plain, January 1942

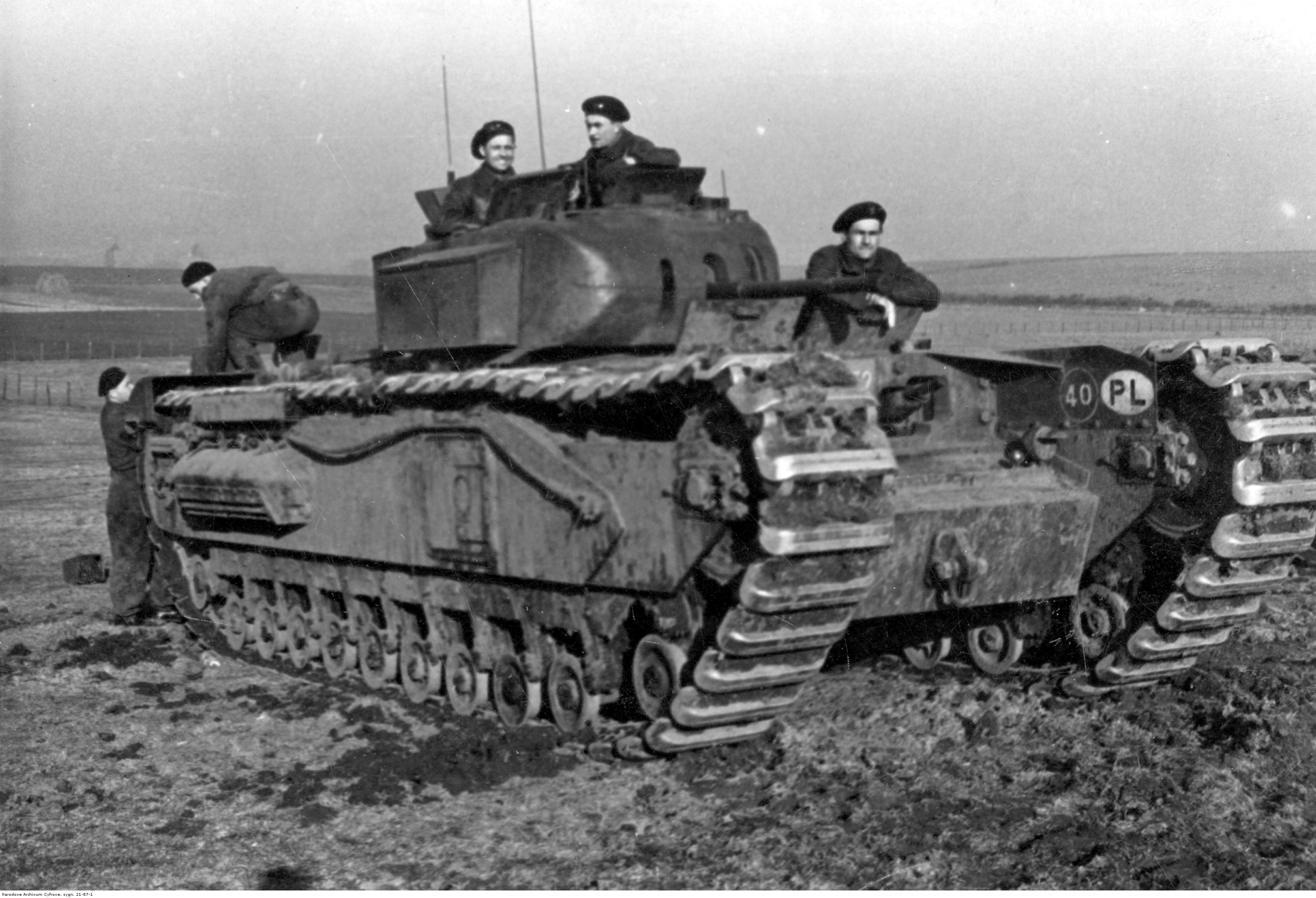
Churchill Mk II tank of the Polish 16th Armoured Brigade in the United Kingdom.

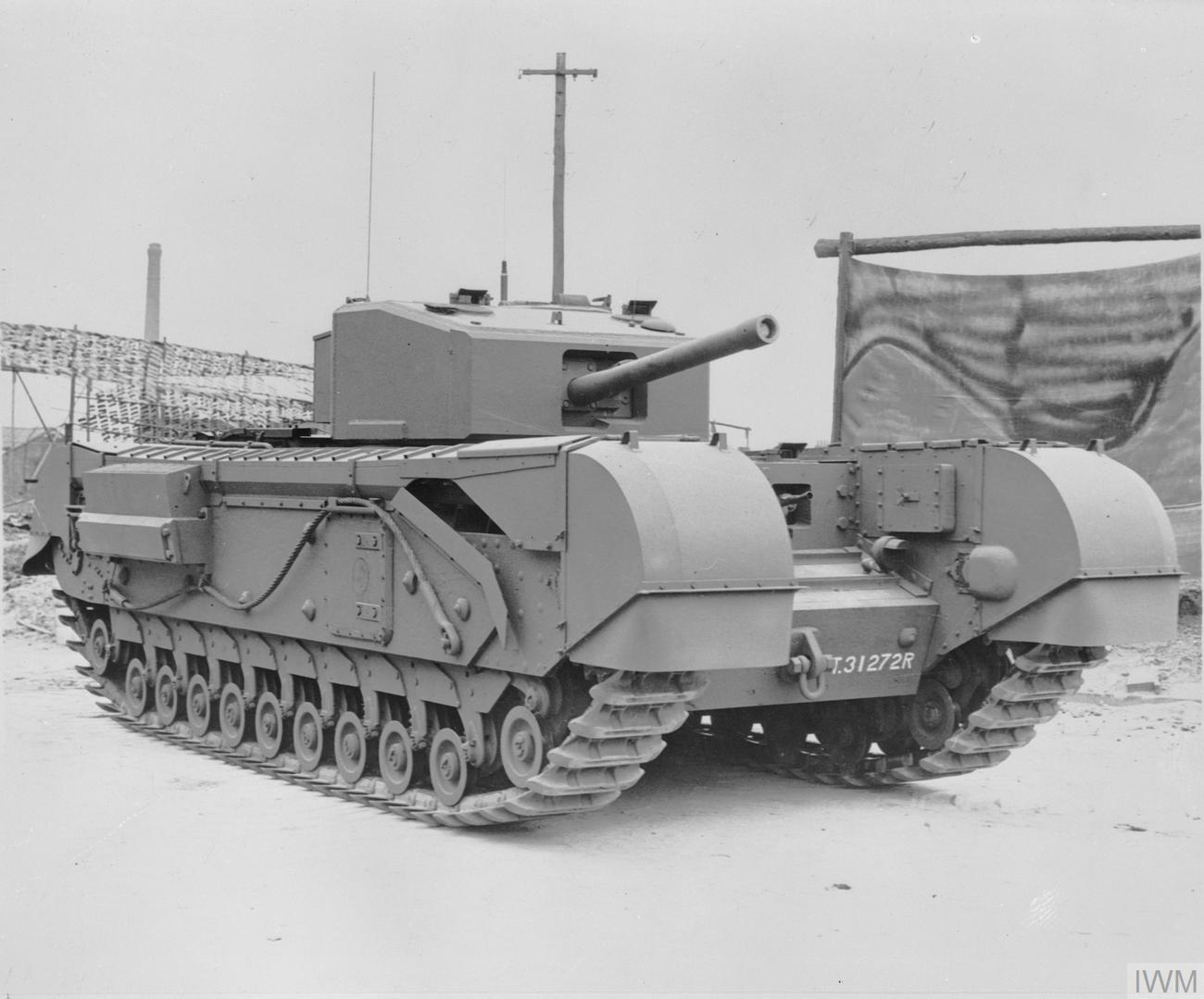
Churchill Mark III, looking noticeably different from the Mark I, with a new turret and gun, and new side skirtings for the tracks

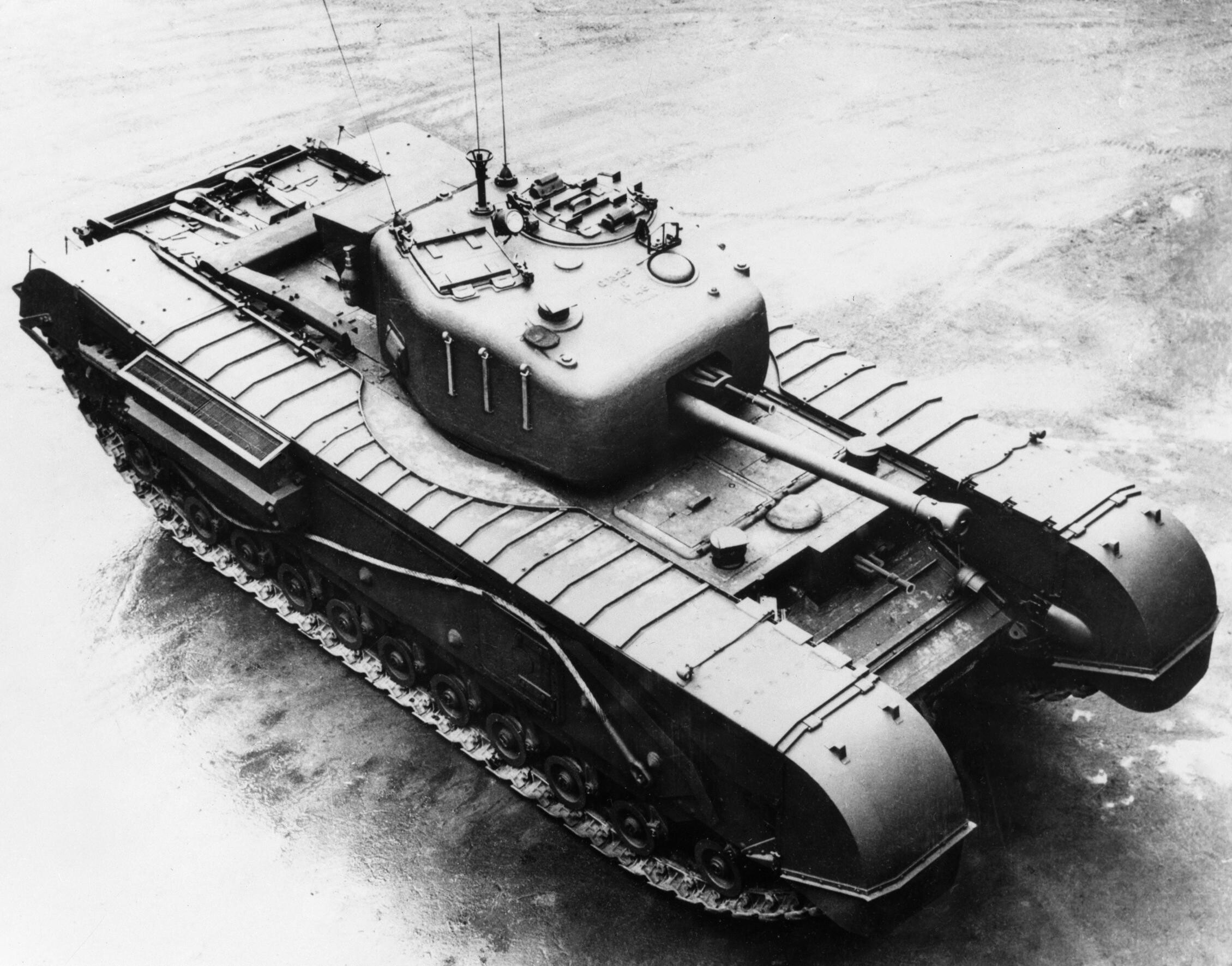
Churchill Mark VI

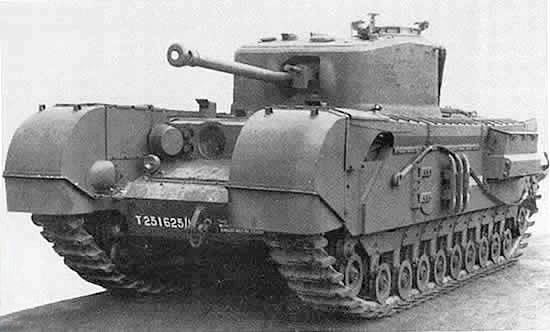
Churchill Mark VII

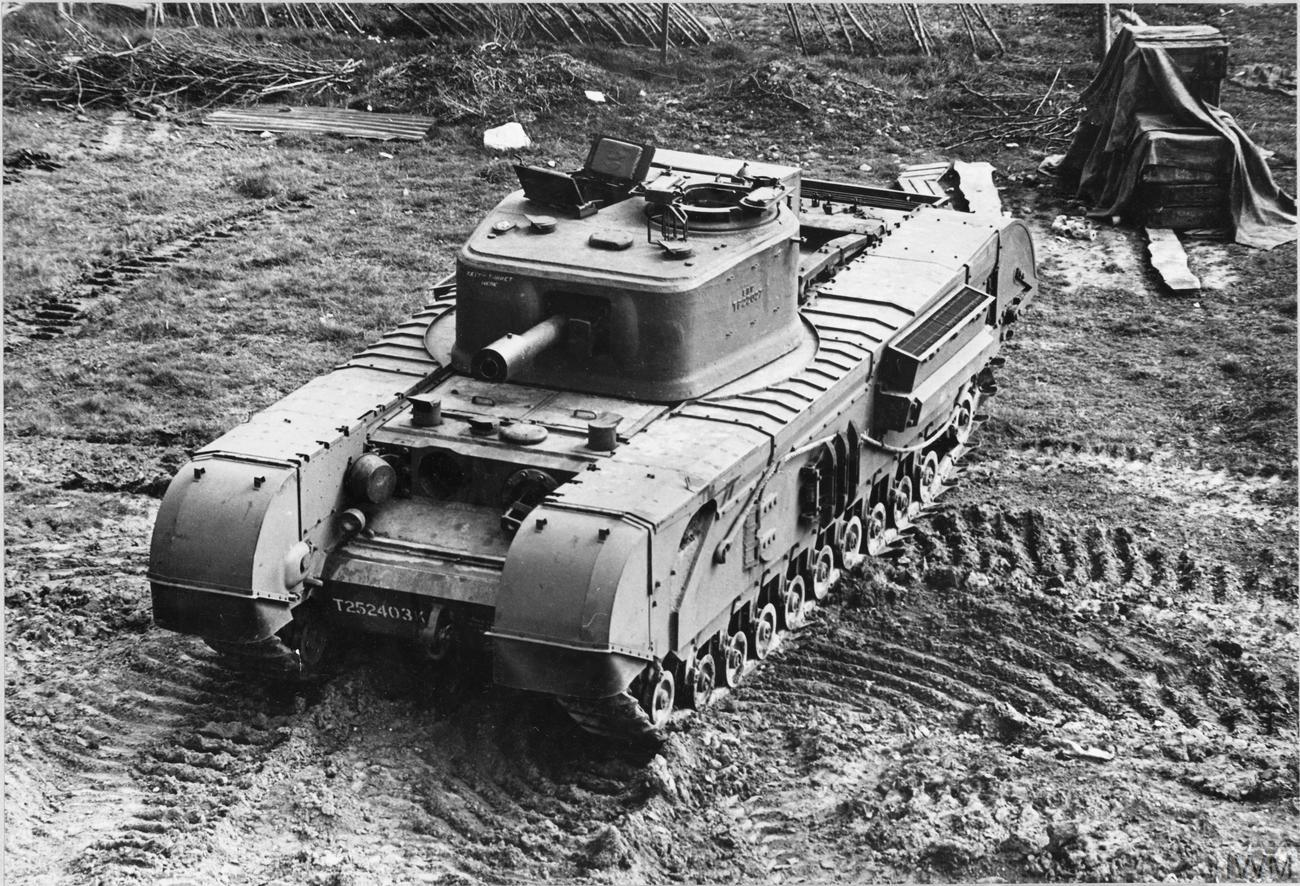
Churchill Mark VIII with 95 mm howitzer

During the course of the war, as well as new production, older vehicles were reworked to bring them up to later standard. For example, 2-pdr turrets were replaced with the 6-pdr turret, and the improved commander's cupola (with eight periscopes) introduced after the first Mark VII was applied to some earlier marks as well. Nearly 3,100 Churchills of all marks were rebuilt. Early tanks were produced before the Churchill name was attached and were retroactively known as Churchill Mark I etc.

Churchill tank development

I
II
OKE	IIcs
III/IV
AVRE	75mm	VI	V
ARK	X	XI	IX[LT]
VII
Crocodile	VIII	AVRE

The following Churchill variants saw primary use as battle tanks:

Churchill I
303 produced. Equipped with a 40 mm Ordnance QF 2-pounder gun in the turret with 150 rounds and a coaxial Besa machine gun. It was equipped with an Ordnance QF 3 inch howitzer in the hull, with 58 rounds, for use against infantry. It was a tank that was noted for poor mechanical reliability. This variant was used alongside Mark IIs and IIIs with Canadian forces on the Dieppe Raid and in Tunisia; some were still in use late in the war in Italy on the Gothic Line.

Churchill Mk II
1,127 produced. Replaced the hull howitzer with another machine gun to reduce cost and complexity. Sometimes referred to as "Churchill Ia".
Churchill Mk IICS
Close support. Placed the 2-pounder gun in the hull and the howitzer in the turret, available in very limited numbers. Sometimes called the "Churchill II". Not used in combat.
Churchill Mk III
675 produced. The III was the first major armament overhaul of the series, eliminating the hull howitzer and equipping the tank with a more powerful Ordnance QF 6-pounder gun with 84 rounds. It had a new welded, "cleaner", squarish turret (from Babcock & Wilcox Ltd) unlike earlier versions. The availability of rolled armour plate limited the number that could be built – leading to the Mark IV. The first Mark to have "catwalks" over the upper track runs to protect the tracks; examples later upgunned with the QF 75 mm gun are known as the Churchill III*.
Churchill Mk IV
1,622 produced. The IV, the most numerous Churchill produced, was virtually identical to the III, the largest change being a return to the cheaper cast turret, keeping the welded turret's "clean" squarish shape. A tank telephone was fitted to the rear of the tank for communication with infantry. In earlier models, turrets using the 6-pounder Mark V were fitted with a counterweight. Two hundred and ten were refitted in North Africa with US 75 mm guns taken from battle-damaged M4 Sherman tanks (the Churchill NA75's), while others were up-gunned with British Ordnance QF 75 mm guns, creating the Mark IV (75). The QF 75 mm had a muzzle brake unlike the 6-pounder.
Churchill Mk V
241 produced. A Churchill equipped with a close support Ordnance QF 95 mm howitzer with 47 rounds in place of the main gun in a cast turret. The gun could fire smoke, HE, or HEAT round with a maximum range of 6,800 yd (6,200 m). Produced from the Mark IV production run at about 1 in 10. The turret was similar to the Marks IV/VI turrets, with a slightly different opening for the gun in the turret front face.
Churchill Mk VI
200 produced. Along with several minor improvements, such as an additional collar at the turret base protecting the turret ring, it was produced as standard with the 75 mm Mark V gun. Few were built due to the impending release of the VII and concurrent up-gunning of the Marks III/IV.
Churchill Mk VII (A22F)
1,600 produced, together with Mark VIII. The second big redesign, the VII used the 75mm gun, was wider and carried much more armour, 50 per cent thicker at the front than a Tiger I, giving it the ability to withstand massive amounts of punishment. It is sometimes called the "Heavy Churchill" and was given the specification number "A42" in 1945. This version of the Churchill first saw service in the Battle of Normandy and equipped three Royal Armoured Corps regiments in western Europe, one in Italy and with 7th Royal Tank Regiment in Korea. The Mark VII was designed to be able to be converted into the "Crocodile" flame-throwing variant without major modification.
Churchill Mk VIII
1,600 produced, together with Mark VII. A Churchill VII with a 95 mm howitzer and 47 rounds in a slightly different turret.
Churchill Mk IX
Churchill III/IV upgraded with extra armour added to hull and turret, along with gearbox and suspension modifications. If the original turret was retained without added armour it was called LT ("Light Turret").
Churchill Mk X
The same improvements as for the IX applied to a Mk VI.
Churchill Mk XI
The same improvements as for the IX applied to a Mk V CS. Does not appear to have been built.
Churchill NA75
210 produced. Churchill IVs with 6-pounder guns replaced (under Operation Whitehot) by US 75 mm guns and mantlets from destroyed or scrapped Sherman tanks, fitted to Churchill IV cast turrets. Their performance was virtually identical to the VI. They were known as NA75 (North Africa 75) where the first conversions took place, after 48 Shermans with new guns had been disabled by mines. Some Mark IIIs were also modified, using Mark IV turrets. To fit the Sherman mantlet required cutting away the front of the Churchill turret before it was welded in place, then the mantlet slot had to be cut away to give sufficient elevation. The Sherman 75 mm gun was designed for a left hand loader and the Churchill, in common with British practice, had a right hand loader. The gun was turned upside down and the firing controls adapted. The conversion of about 200 tanks was carried out between March and June 1944 and the conversion project earned the officer in charge, Capt. Percy Morrell, an MBE and a promotion.

=== Specialist vehicles ===
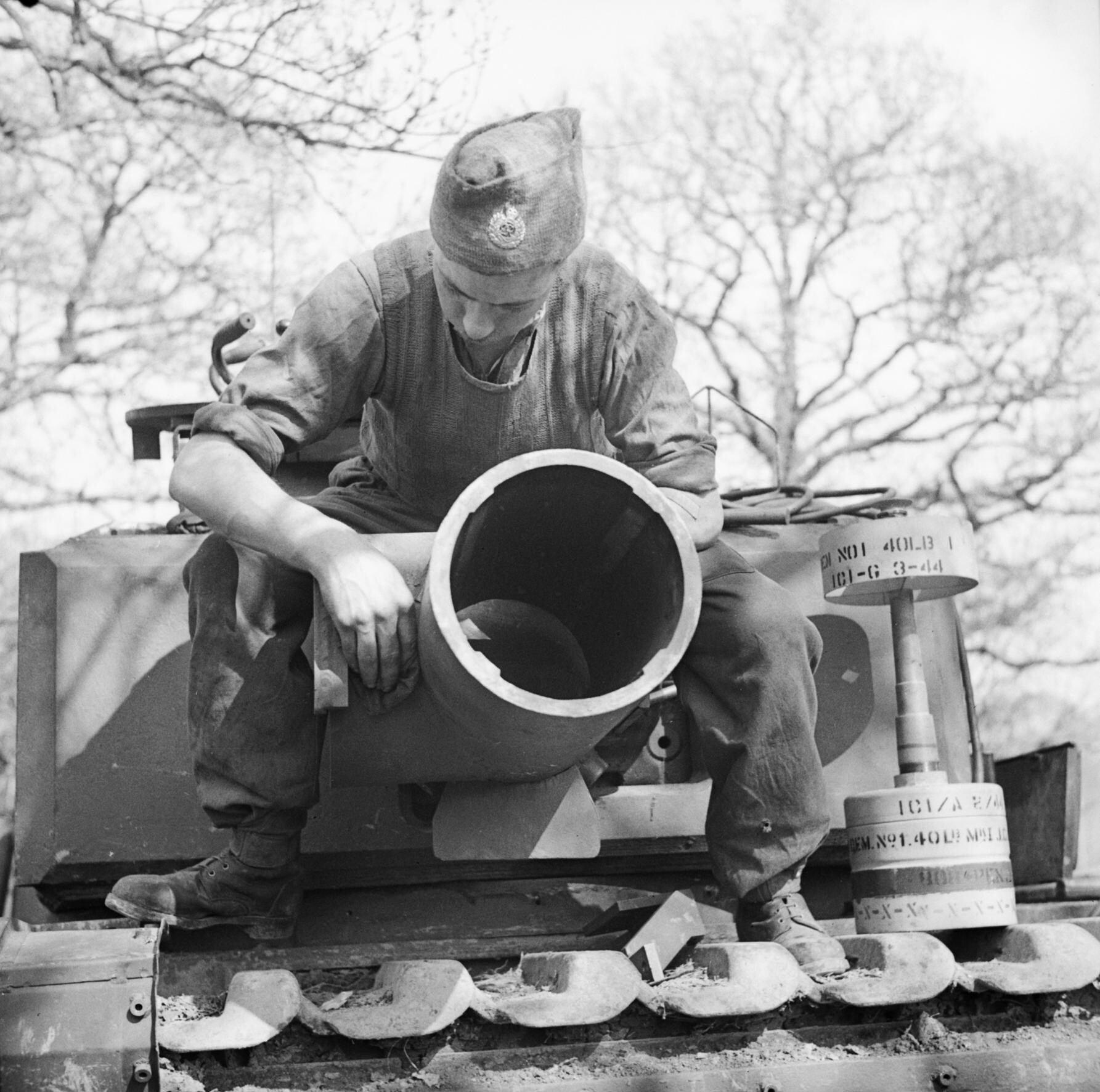
AVRE 230mm Petard Mortar and its ammunition (projectile standing on its flat nose, with tail facing up, at right)

In addition to the tanks, several specialist Churchill variants were developed, chiefly for combat engineering roles. The Churchill Assault Vehicle Royal Engineers was a Churchill III or IV armed with a spigot mortar demolition weapon which replaced the 6 pounder gun. The effective range of the 230mm high-explosive "flying dustbin" round was only around 80 yards of 230 yard maximum range. Crew was increased to six to accommodate a demolition NCO in addition to driver, commander, gunner, wireless operator, and co-driver/machine gunner. As well as the mortar ammunition it carried "General Wade" 26 lb explosive charge, and "Beehive" charges of up to 75 lbs of explosive. Both types of charge had to be set manually, loading from the front of the barrel like a muzzle-loader, but could be detonated from the relative safety of the AVRE interior. The AVRE could be fitted to carry different combat engineering equipment.

The Churchill Crocodile was a flamethrower tank which replaced the hull machine gun with a flamethrower and towed an armoured fuel trailer.

Churchills were converted to "Kangaroo" armoured personnel carriers by removing the turret from Churchills.

=== Further development ===
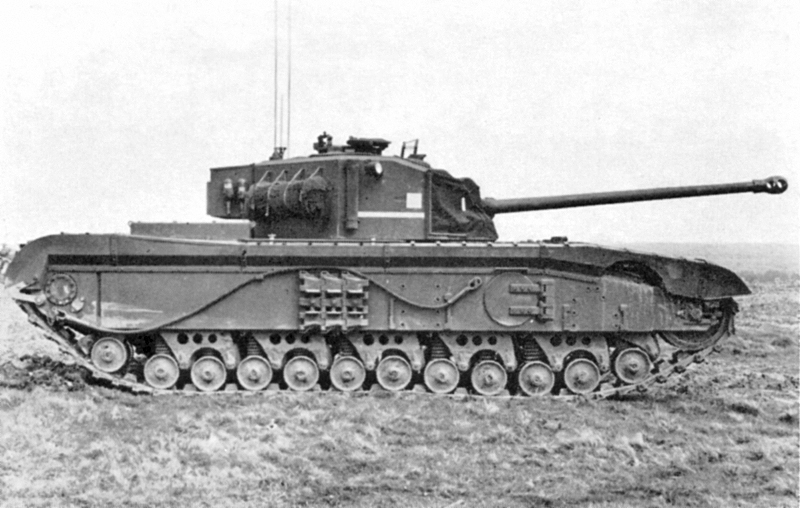
Side view of the Black Prince, probably taken near the end of the war.

The Black Prince (General Staff specification A43) was a development of the Churchill design. In 1943, an attempt was made to produce a Churchill with the same 17 pounder anti-tank gun which was installed on the Sherman Firefly, the gun, a British modification of the American M4 Sherman, on a Churchill chassis and turret. It was known that insufficient numbers of the 17 pounder armed Cruiser Mk VIII Challenger were going to be produced in time for the invasion of Europe, and work was only starting on the Centurion cruiser design. Due to the wider turret ring required, Vauxhall had to redesign the hull though it used as much of the Churchill Mark VII as possible including retaining the Bedford Flat-12 engine which led to the heavier Black Prince being consequently much slower, going from 15 MPH (24 km/h) to 10.5 MPH onroad, and 7.5 mph offroad. This resulted in the "Tank, Infantry, Black Prince (A43)". Six prototypes were built and delivered in May 1945 just as the war in Europe was ending. The test programme was completed but the project was cancelled due to the success of the new and less complicated Centurion Mark I, which offered the same armament and frontal armour, was faster and more manoeuvrable, and had just entered production. Two Black Princes currently survive. The one that is fully intact is No. 4 of the prototypes, and is displayed at The Tank Museum in Bovington. The second surviving Black Prince is only a hull, recovered from Salisbury plain in the 80s as part of the Tony Budge collection. It is now held as of today by the Rex and Rod Cadman collection. After the Black Prince, no more Churchills were developed, as the army had shifted in favour of the above-mentioned Centurion, which was mainly claimed as the first main battle tank, and also, the British army was going through a change of doctrine, meaning large infantry tanks to support men were no longer needed on the front.

== Operators ==
- Australia – retired, replaced with the Centurion main battle tank
- Canada – retired, replaced with the Centurion
- Czechoslovakia – 1st Czechoslovak armoured Independent Brigade
- India – retired
- (Republic of Ireland) Ireland – retired in 1969, replaced with the Comet cruiser tank
- Poland (Polish Armed Forces in the West) – retired in 1947 without replacement
- United Kingdom – retired from British Army service in 1952, replaced by the Centurion
- Soviet Union (Lend-Lease) – retired, replaced with IS-3 and T-10 heavy tanks
- Kingdom of Iraq – retired, replaced with the Centurion

== Surviving vehicles ==
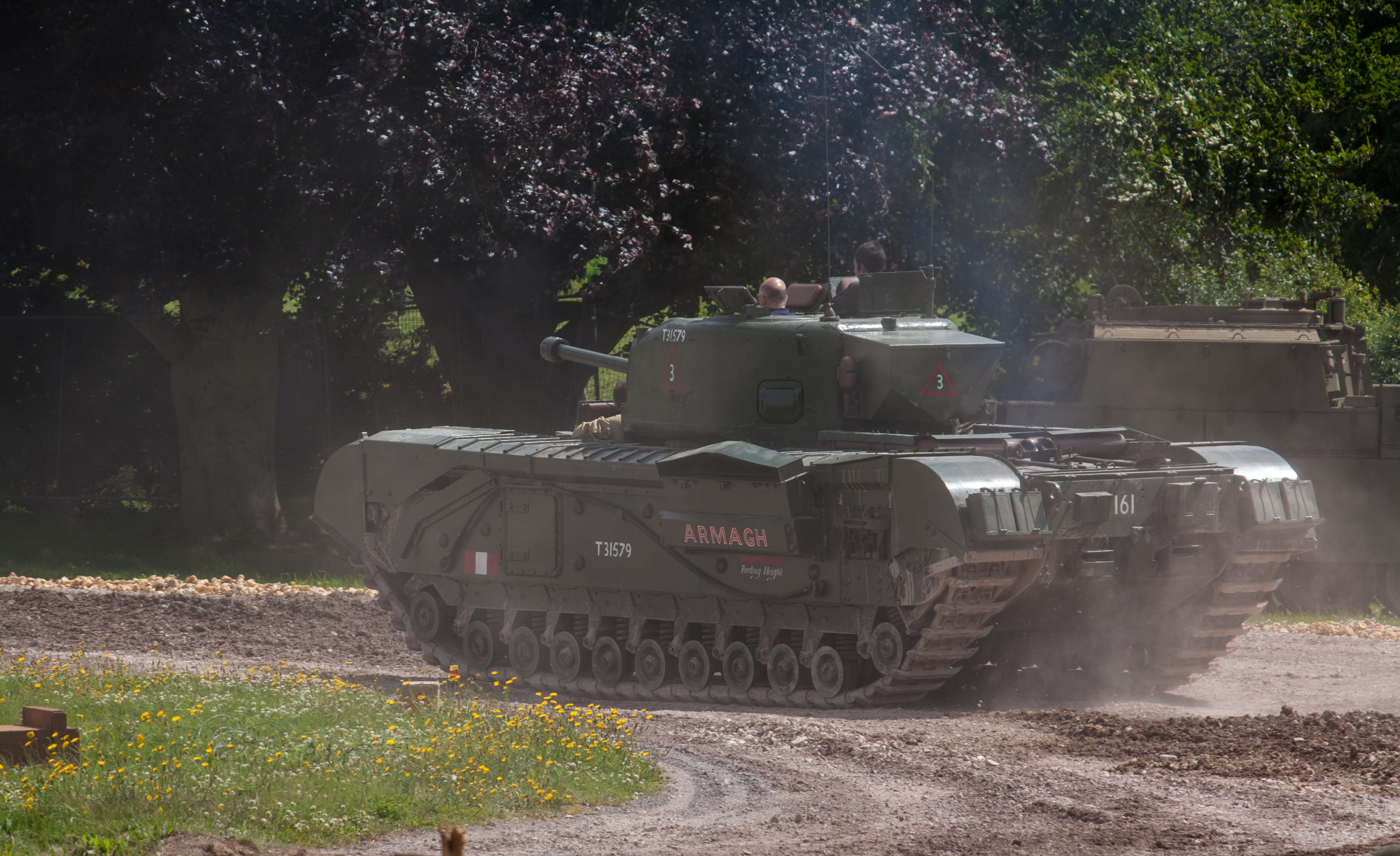
The Churchill Trust's Mark IV participating in The Tank Museum's Tankfest 2012

A number of Churchills still exist as gate guardians or war memorials, while many examples reside in museums. Jacques Littlefield's Military Vehicle Technology Foundation in California, United States, acquired a Flail FV3902 "Toad" in its collection in 2008 after it was restored to full working order by RR Services in Kent, England; it was subsequently sold at auction and acquired by the Australian Armour and Artillery Museum. There are two Churchill Mark IVs at Normandy in France; one is residing at Lion-sur-Mer, while the other is located at Graye-sur-Mer.

The Churchill Trust is a project that aims to restore existing Churchills to their original condition and working order. So far, a Mark III AVRE with appliqué armour, salvaged from a firing range, and a post-war Mark IV Twin-ARK have been restored to running condition. The specialist equipment was removed and turrets were added, converting both tanks into their original variants. As of 2016 the project was in the process of restoring a Mark VII AVRE recovered from a range in northern England.

The Tank Museum in Bovington Camp, Dorset, England, currently has four Churchills in its collection: a Mark VII in The Tank Story Hall as a static exhibit, a working Mark III AVRE as a static display (currently located in the museum's Conservation Hall), a Mark VI returned to the museum after the closure of the Isle of Wight Military History Museum (also currently located in the museum's Conservation Hall) and a Mark II (with cosmetic alterations to make it appear as a Mark I) as an outdoor static display. The museum's Mark VII was the last Mark VII produced; it went directly to the museum from the factory, and in terms of mileage, is virtually brand new. The Mark III AVRE was salvaged from a firing range marker as a complete wreck. It was restored to running order by Bob Grundy of Wigan and his Tracked Armour Group in August 1988. The museum also has the only surviving Black Prince prototype.

The Churchill Trust and the Tank Museum are not affiliated or associated with one another in any way; their tanks are different and owned separately, and the only common ground between both parties is that the Churchill Trust sometimes sends its tanks to participate in the Tank Museum's annual Tankfest event. Additionally, the Churchill Trust's tanks were all specialist vehicles, but were converted back into the standard turreted heavy tank variants during restoration. In 2018 the two parties concluded a long-term agreement that saw the Churchill Trust loan all three of its Churchills to the Tank Museum, with the III* becoming a permanent part of the museum's fleet of running vehicles and the IV and VII being included in the museum's Second World War exhibitions. The Churchill III* was restored in time for Tankfest 2019, and ran at the event.

The Cavalry Tank Museum, Ahmednagar. Maharashtra, India has one Churchill Mark VII, a Mark X (uparmoured Mk VI chassis; Mk VII turret; 75mm gun; Mk VII driver's visor and MG mount), a Churchill bridgelayer and a Churchill ARV.

A Mk. VII Churchill Tank stands at the side of the Marine Highway, Carrickfergus, Co. Antrim. The restored vehicle was a gift to the Borough from the Trustees of the North Irish Horse Regimental Association.

A Churchill AVRE is also at the South African Armour Museum, situated at the Tempe Military Base, Bloemfontein, South Africa. The museum is hoping to restore it to running condition. Another example of the Churchill AVRE can also be found at the South African Museum of Military History in Johannesburg, South Africa. It is an outdoor static display, in good condition and is named 'Sweet Sue'.

The Irish Defence Forces have preserved one of the four Churchill Mk. VI tanks that were bought from the British Army in 1950. It is on display at the Curragh Camp Military Museum.

The D-Day Story in Portsmouth, England has a Churchill Mk. VII Crocodile on display alongside an M4 Sherman Grizzly. The tank is displayed on an LCT (Landing Craft Tank).

Vieux in France, has a restored Mk. VII at the memorial site of Hill 112.

== See also ==
- Tanks in the British Army
- Matilda II – (United Kingdom)
- Excelsior tank – (United Kingdom)
- T14 heavy tank – (United States)
- M6 heavy tank – (United States)
- Kliment Voroshilov tank – (Soviet Union)
- Tiger I – (Nazi Germany)
- Tiger II – (Nazi Germany)
