= Covenanter tank =

British WWII cruiser tank

Covenanter cruiser tank
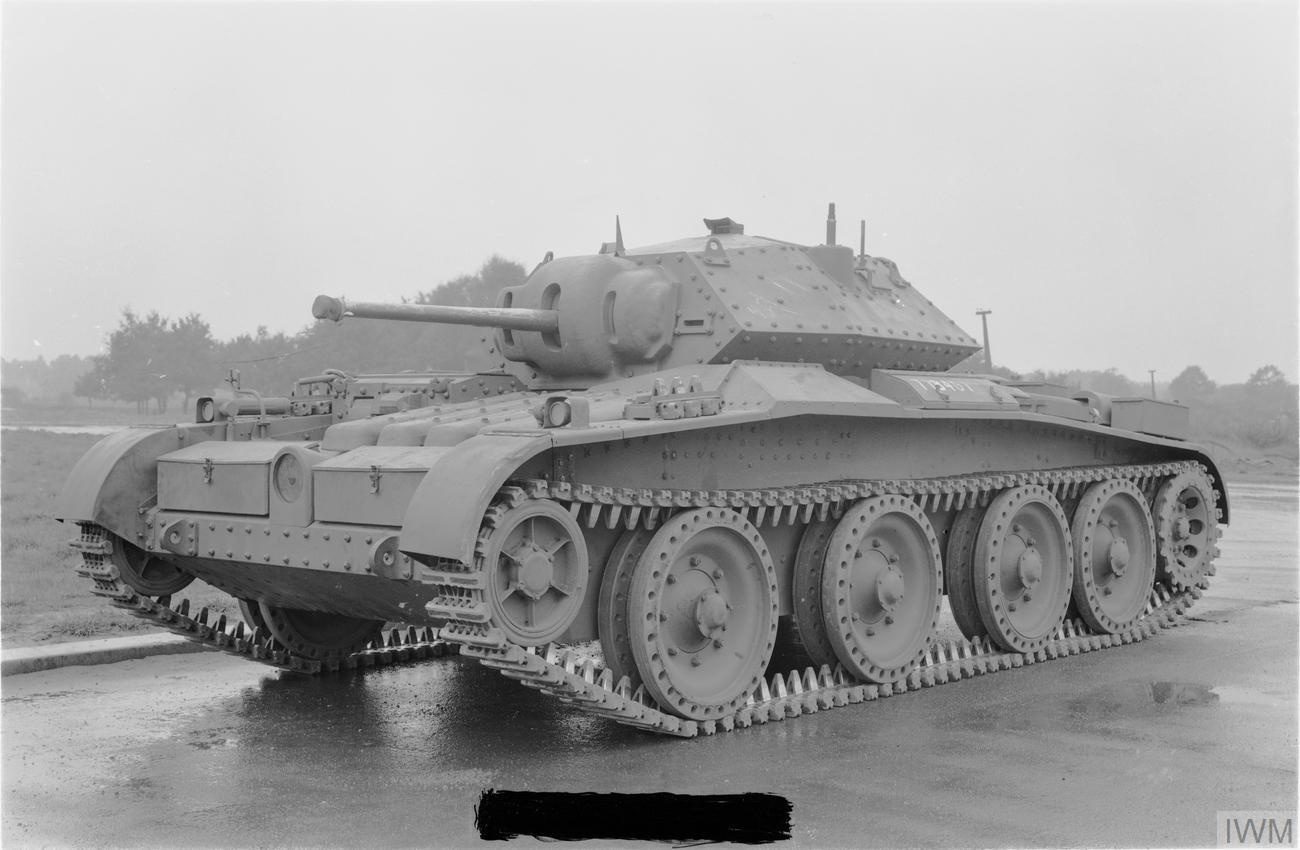
- Tank, Cruiser, Mk V, Covenanter (A13 Mk III)
- Type: Cruiser tank
- Place of origin: United Kingdom

Service history
- In service: 1940–1943

Production history
- Designer: LMS/Nuffield (turret)
- Manufacturer: LMS, English Electric Leyland Motors
- Produced: 1939–1943
- No. built: 1,771

Specifications
- Mass: 18 long tons (18 t)
- Length: 19 ft 0 in (5.79 m)
- Width: 8 ft 7 in (2.62 m)
- Height: 7 ft 4 in (2.24 m)
- Crew: 4 (commander, gunner, loader, driver)
- Armour: 7–40 mm (0.28–1.57 in)
- Main armament: 2-pounder (40 mm)
- Secondary armament: 7.92 mm Besa machine gun (coaxial); 0.303 Bren for AA defence
- Engine: Meadows D.A.V flat-12 340 hp (250 kW)
- Power/weight: 18.6 hp (13.9 kW) / tonne
- Transmission: Meadows gearbox with Wilson epicyclic steering
- Suspension: Christie
- Fuel capacity: 92 imp gal (420 L; 110 US gal) (Note: Marks I and II could carry an auxiliary tank of 33 imp gal (150 L; 40 US gal))
- Operational range: 100 mi (160 km)
- Maximum speed: 30 mph (48 km/h)

The Cruiser tank Mk V or A13 Mk III Covenanter was a British cruiser tank of the Second World War. The Covenanter was the first cruiser tank design to be given a name. Designed by the London, Midland and Scottish Railway as a better-armoured replacement for the Cruiser Mark IV, it was ordered into production in 1939 before pilot models were built. Problems with the design became apparent only after production was under way.

The tank equipped various British armoured divisions for home defence and training. It never left the UK as poor engine cooling caused the Mk I to Mk III to be declared unfit for overseas service, especially in hot climates. This was rectified in the Mk IV after many corrective actions were undertaken but, by February 1944, it was declared obsolete. More than 1,700 of the type were built.

== Development ==
In 1938, the War Office had issued a requirement for a new, better-armoured "heavy" cruiser tank to replace the Cruiser IV. Nuffield's A16 (and the A14) design was found to be too expensive and, in 1939, a cheaper and lighter cruiser tank – under General Staff specification A13 Mk III Cruiser Mark V – was chosen to be developed. It had nothing apart from Christie suspension and armament in common with the other A13 specifications.

The initial specification required a 2-pounder gun, at least one machine gun, the same A13 Christie suspension in a lower hull, epicyclic steering transmission and "armour standard" (armour basis) of 30 mm (1.2 in). The 30 mm (1.2 in) armoured standard referred to any vertical plate having to be 30 mm (1.2 in) thick. Angled surfaces (through the principles of sloped armour) could be thinner, provided they were at least as effective as a 30 mm (1.2 in) thick vertical plate.

From these, a design using many sloped surfaces was chosen to keep the weight low. To keep the silhouette low, the suspension used cranked arms and a low profile engine was envisaged. The engine, which was to be specifically designed for it, was to deliver at least 300 hp (220 kW). The Wilson transmission and steering of the A16 would be used.

Design work was by the London, Midland and Scottish Railway Company (LMS), who had no prior experience in the design and production of fighting vehicles and had been invited to participate under a Government policy that British companies should develop skills in expectation of war. (Note: LMS was also involved in production of the Cruiser Mark III) The design assumed a welded hull rather than the usual riveting. The turret was designed by Nuffield, with Henry Meadows designing a new low profile engine for it. On 17 April 1939, before a prototype was produced, the first 100 vehicles were ordered from the LMS. Additional orders soon followed, with English Electric and Leyland Motors joining the production effort, for a final production total of 1,771 Covenanters. (Note: Bingham quotes 1,365 Covenanters) Nuffield was also approached but preferred to design its own offspring of the A13 line, which became the Cruiser Mk.VI Crusader. Due to the expectation of war, the design was ordered "off the drawing board". The expectation was that two pilot models would serve for testing and results applied to the production lines.

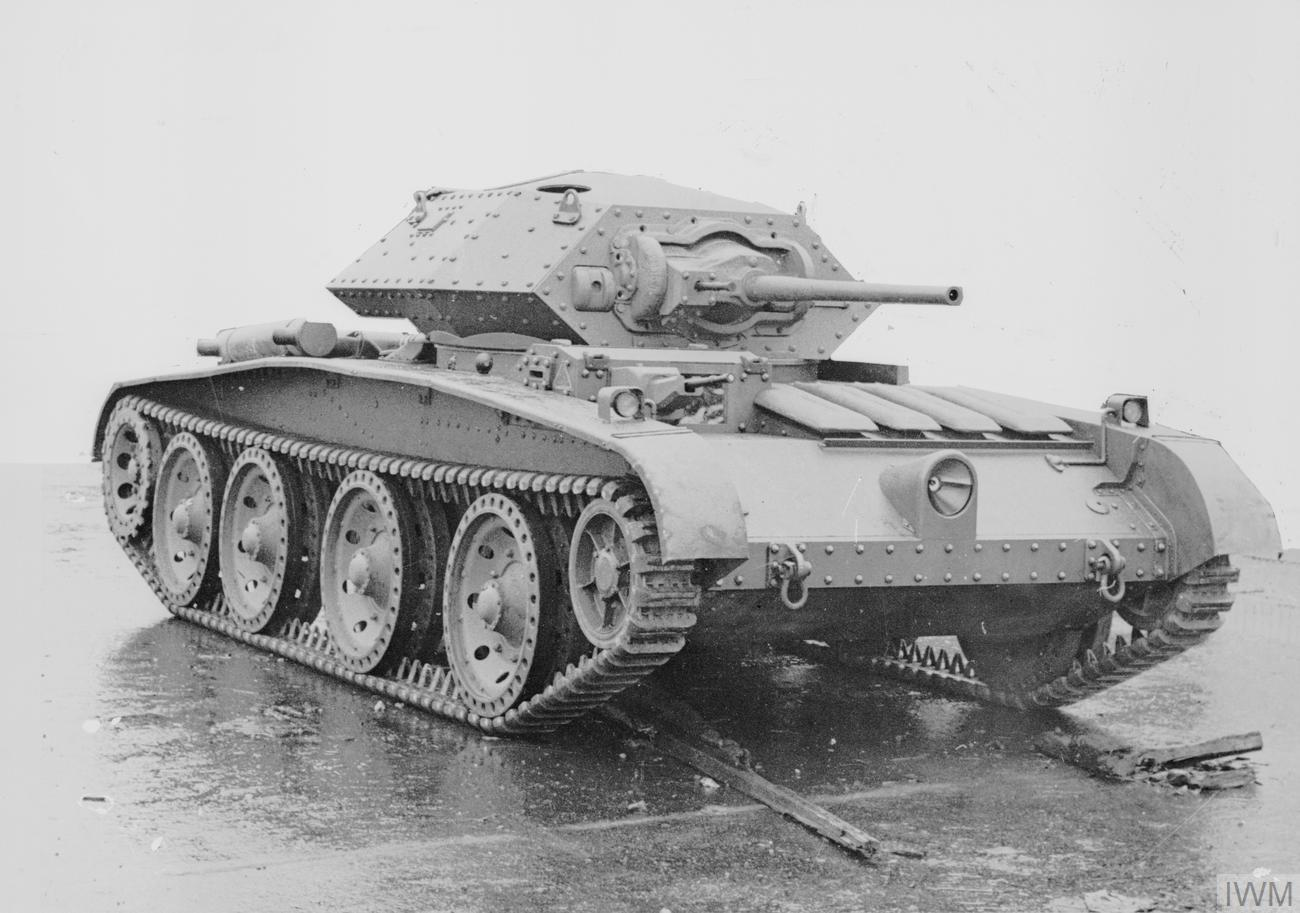
A pilot model, the radiator covers are at the left front. It has a Valentine-type gun mantlet, most production Covenanters had a different type.

To meet the engine requirement, a horizontally opposed 12-cylinder design was used. Although flat, it was wide and left no room for radiators in the engine compartment and so the radiators were situated at the front of the vehicle. The unusual arrangement, although tested in mock up form first, when combined with the rushed design resulted in serious problems with engine cooling. Even when the systems were redesigned, there were problems and the piping from engine to the radiators heated the fighting compartment. These problems meant that the Covenanter would not be employed in the North African Campaign. Instead, Crusaders and American tanks were sent to Africa, while the Covenanters remained at home.

LMS advised a return to riveted construction due to doubts about the strength of the welds and rather than risk delays due to a lack of welders, this was accepted. The welded design used two layers of armour plate, the inner being of steel that would weld readily without losing its properties. This two-plate system was retained when the design reverted to riveted construction. The use of rivets, steel wheels instead of aluminium and an increase in armour specification to 40 millimetres (1.6 in) at the front of hull and turret increased the weight to a level where the tank suspension was at maximum load, leaving no room for later development of the design. (Note: Aluminium had become a priority material that was allocated to aircraft production.) Rather than risk the availability of the combined Wilson transmission and steering, affecting production, the A13 "crash" gearbox was used with epicyclic steering units. This necessitated a reduced size of cooling fan for the transmission compartment.

Contracts were placed with the manufacturers in 1939. The pilot model (with welded hull) was successfully tested in 1940; though the second pilot suffered from overheating. The first deliveries of production vehicles were not until after the battle of Dunkirk. Production of turrets lagged behind that of hulls. Production ended in mid-1942. It is surprising that production was continued for so long, because newer, better tank designs were waiting for space on production lines. A Covenanter tank cost the British Government £12,000, a Crusader tank cost £13,700, a Matilda £18,000, and a Valentine £14,900. By late 1943, the Covenanter was considered too weakly armed and armoured to deal with new German tanks. It was decided that neither problem could be addressed without significant changes in the design, the tank was declared obsolete and vehicles except the bridge-layer variant were to be scrapped.

== Service ==
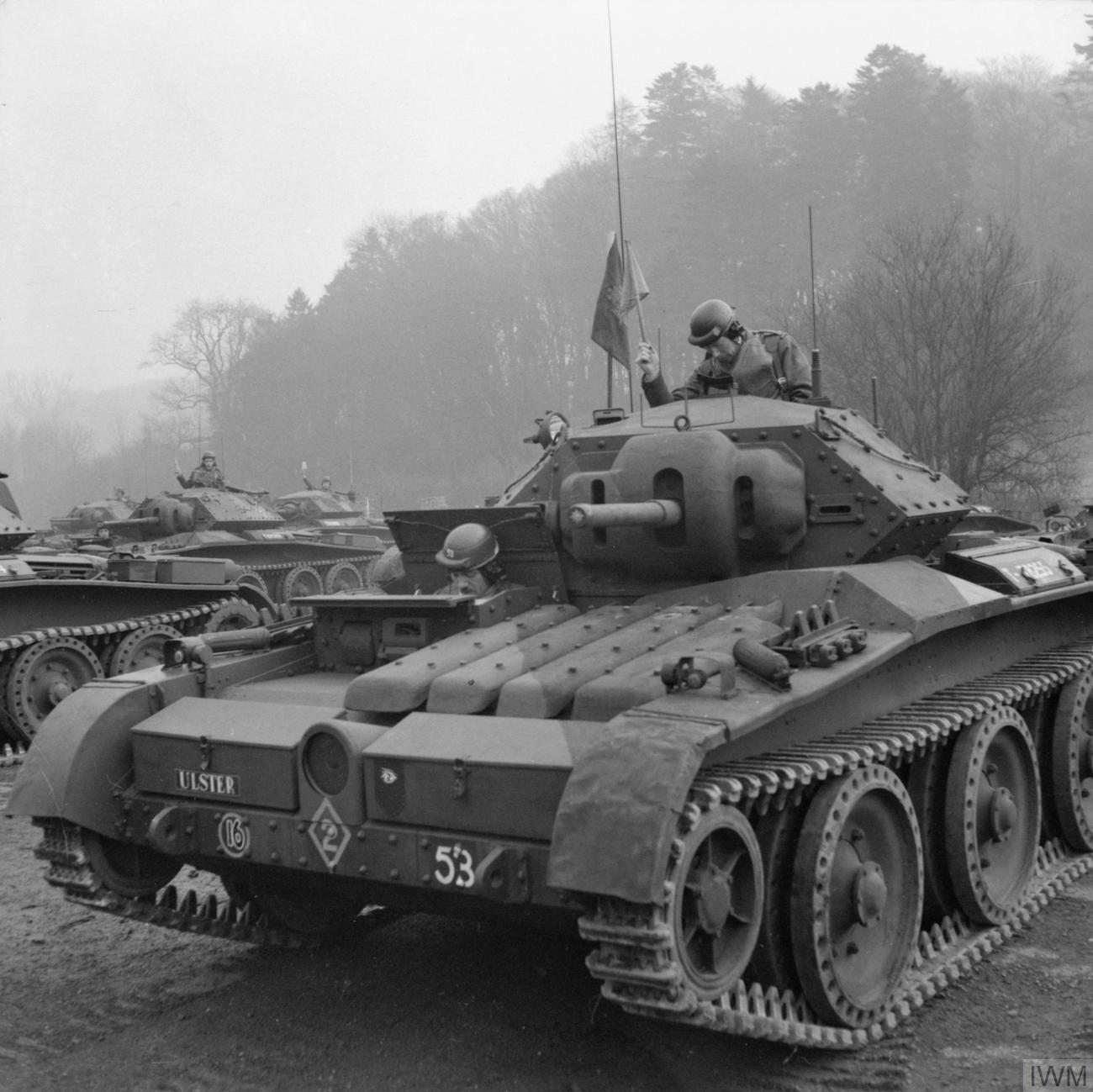
Covenanters of the 2nd (Armoured) Irish Guards, Guards Armoured Division, during an inspection (3 March 1942)

Except for a few trial vehicles, Covenanters were not deployed outside Britain. The Covenanter was used to re-equip the 1st Armoured Division (six armoured regiments in two brigades), which had lost most of its tanks in the Fall of France. When the 1st was sent to Egypt, the tanks were transferred to the 9th Armoured Division.

Eventually, a handful of vehicles, were sent to the desert for service trials and were allocated to the REME for maintenance and evaluation. It is not clear if these tanks were used in combat; the unit markings indicate they may have been deployed alongside Kingforce with their new 6-pounder Churchill Mk III tanks.

Covenanters were also used to equip the Guards Armoured Division in 1942 and elements of the 1st Polish Armoured Division when it was formed in the UK; they were replaced before these units were sent to the frontline, except for a few bridgelayers that both divisions retained and used in their advance through Belgium and the Netherlands.

Observation Post tanks were issued to artillery units to carry Forward Observation Officers for Royal Artillery batteries. In an armoured division, there were two OP tanks for each RHA or field artillery battery; medium gun batteries had one. Command tanks were similar to OP tanks, but had only two Wireless Set No. 19; one on the regiment radio net and the other on the brigade net.

Covenanter bridgelayers were used by the 1st Czechoslovak Armoured Brigade during the siege of Dunkirk from October 1944 to May 1945. The bridgelayer version was also used by the 4th Armoured Brigade of the Australian Army at Bougainville and Balikpapan during the Pacific Campaign in 1945.

== Variants ==
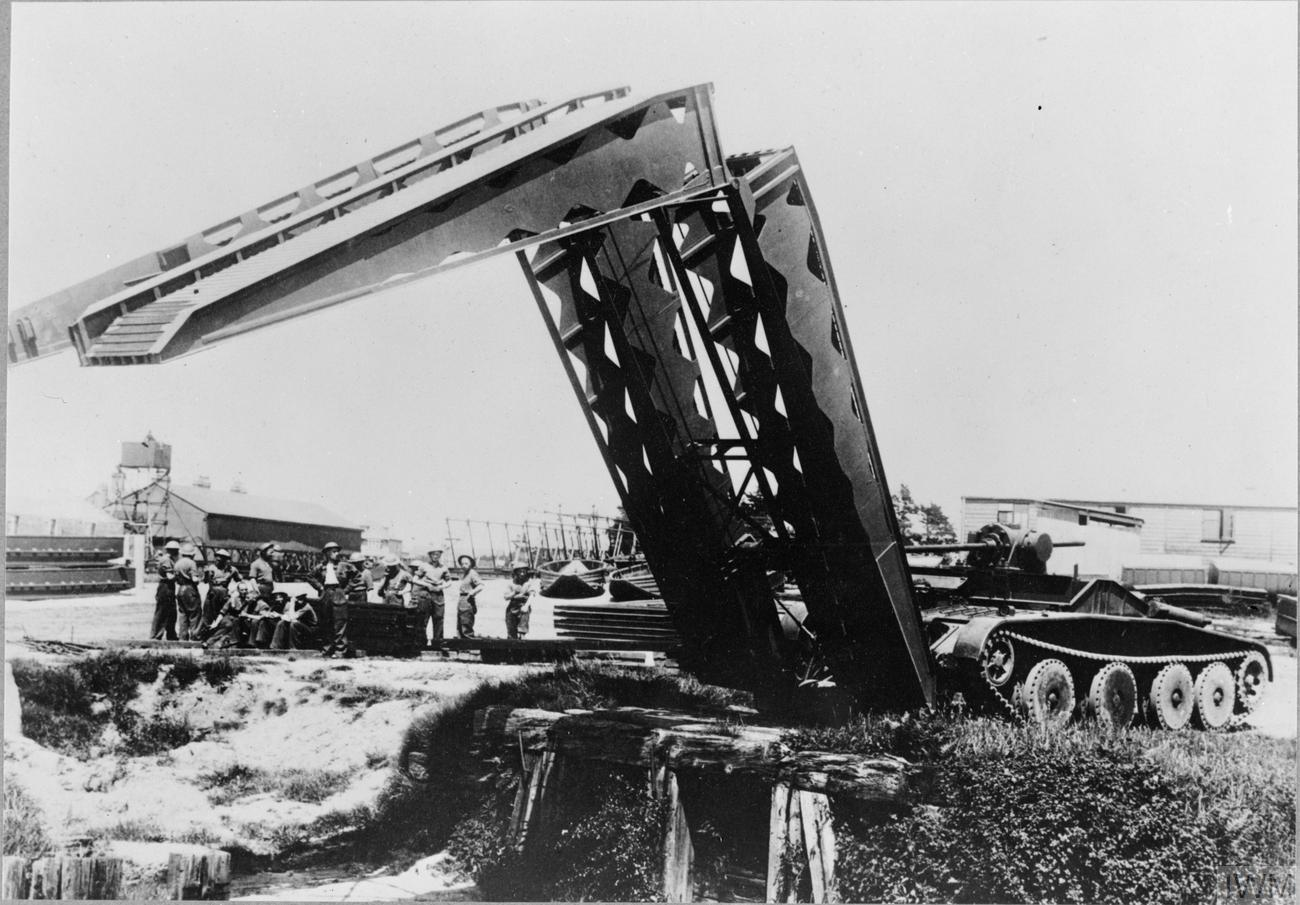
Covenanter bridgelayer with vehicle-launched span

- Covenanter Mk I (Cruiser Mk V) – Original production model.
  - Covenanter Mk I Close Support – Armed with 3-inch howitzer.
- Covenanter Mk II (Cruiser Mk V*) – Mark I production modified by addition of radiator-mounted oil cooler.
  - Covenanter Mk II CS – Armed with 3-inch howitzer.
  - Observation Post version with dummy gun, two No. 19 radios and a No. 18 radio; issued to artillery units. (Note: The No. 19 radio was the standard unit fitted in British tanks, the No. 18 radio was a manpack set intended for short–range telephony in forward areas.)
  - Command version with dummy gun and two No. 19 radios.
- Covenanter Mk III (Cruiser Mk V**) – new production with twin oil coolers installed either side of the engine. Clutch linkage modified. Air cleaners added inboard at the rear. Exhaust silencers moved to the ends of the track guards.
  - Covenanter Mk III CS – Armed with 3-inch howitzer.
- Covenanter Mk IV – New production as the Mk II with the clutch changes of the Mk III.
  - Covenanter Mk IV CS – Armed with 3-inch howitzer.

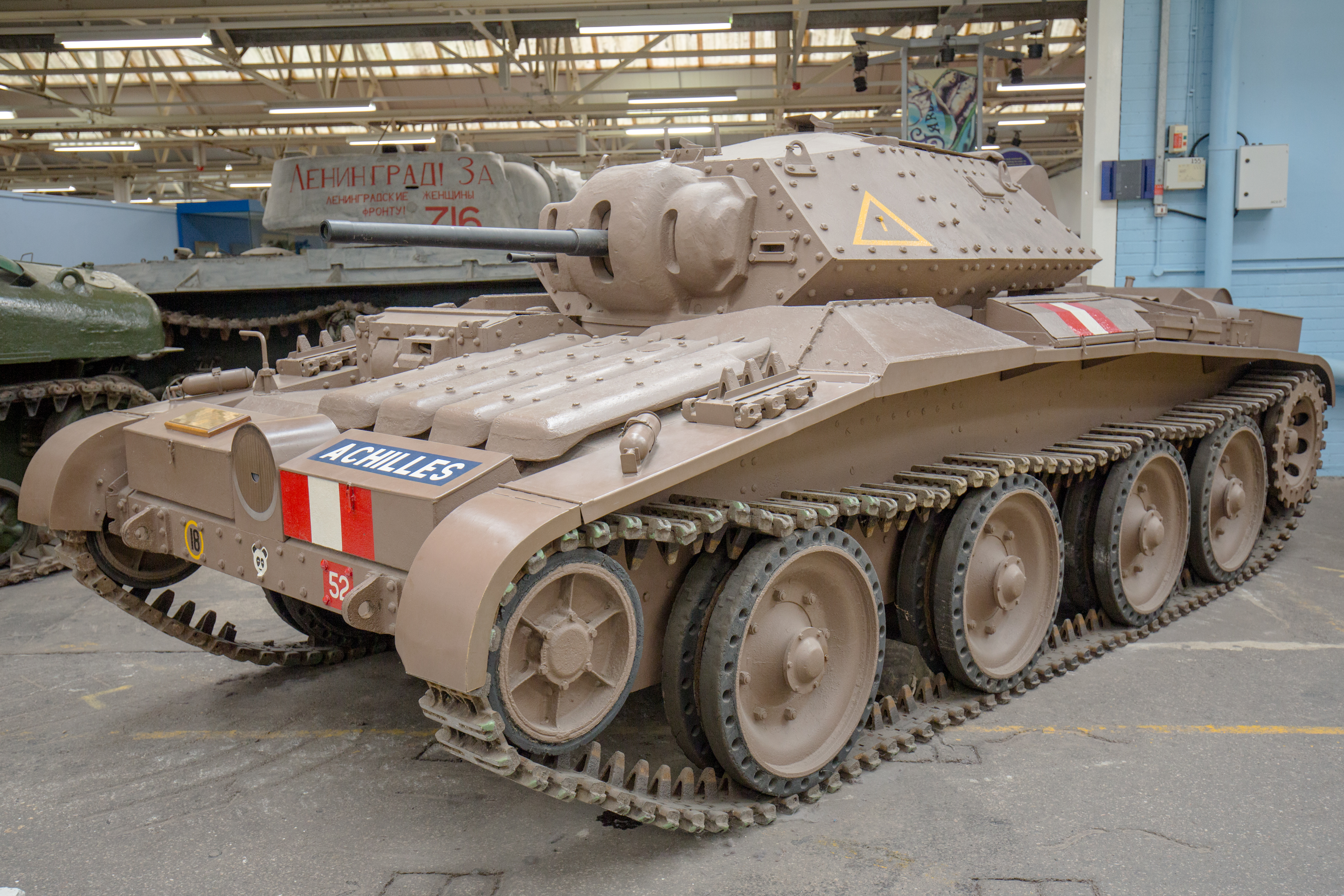
The Tank Museum's Covenanter

  - Observation Post version with dummy gun, two No. 19 radios and No. 18 radio.
- Covenanter Bridgelayer – Covenanter hull fitted with a vehicle-launched bridge ("30 ft No. 1"). This was 34 feet (10 m) long and 9 feet 6 inches (2.90 m) wide. It could span a 30-foot (9 m) gap and was capable of carrying 24 tons. In 1944, an improved bridge was developed with a 30-ton capacity.
- Covenanter ARV Mk I – Armoured recovery vehicle based on turretless Covenanter hull one prototype was built in 1942

Some Covenanters were fitted with the "Anti-Mine Roller Attachment" (AMRA) Mk IC, a mine clearing device consisting of four heavy rollers suspended from a frame. The weight of the rollers could be increased by filling them with water or sand.

== Surviving vehicles ==
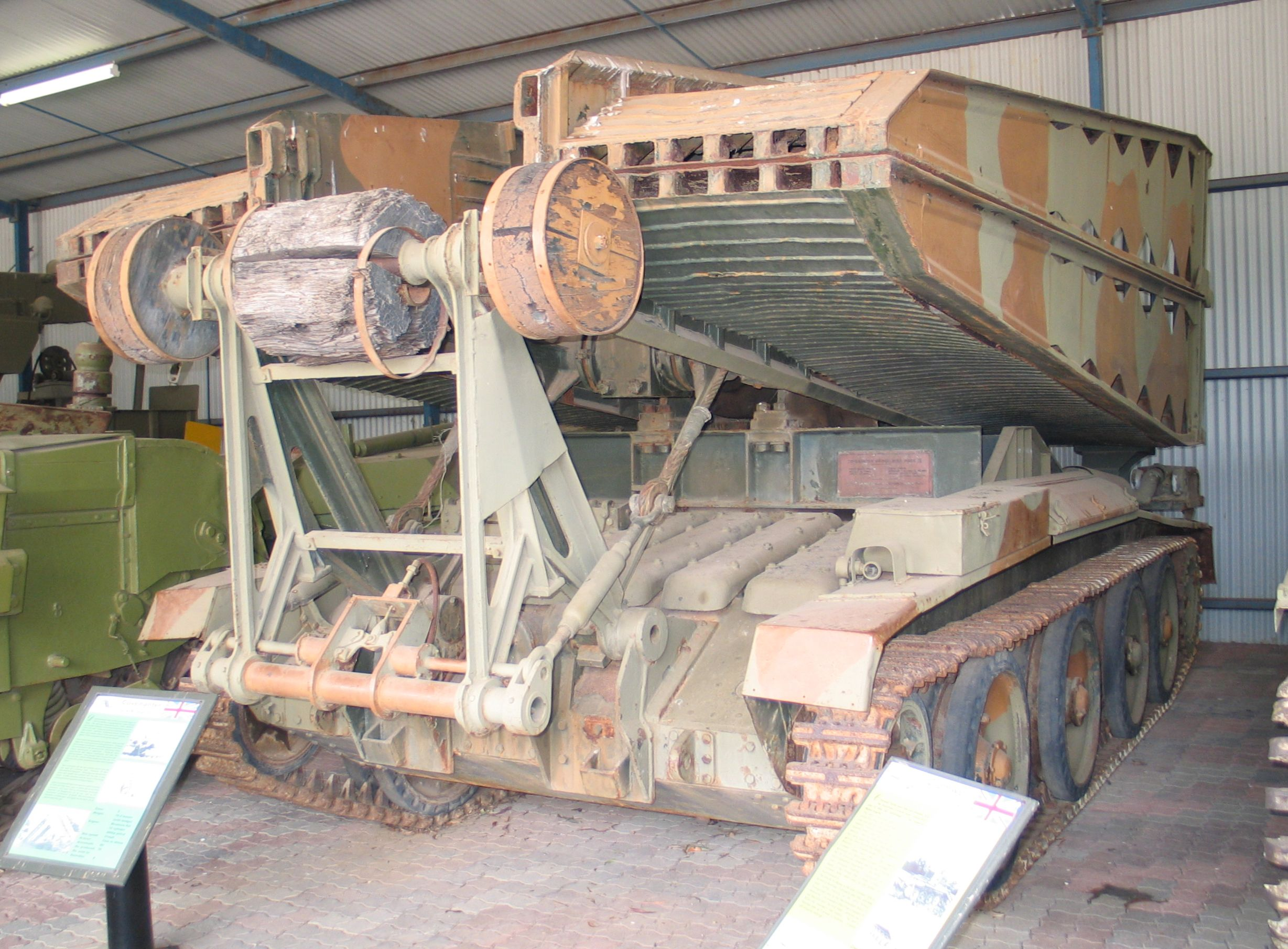
Covenanter bridgelayer at Puckapunyal, Victoria (2007)

A Covenanter gun–tank is preserved at The Tank Museum, Bovington, Hampshire. It is displayed in the markings it had during the War when it served with the 13th/18th Royal Hussars, part of the 9th Armoured Division. For unknown reasons, it was buried after the war on a farm near Dorking. In 1977 it was discovered, recovered, restored and put on display at the Bovington museum in 1985. The Tank Museum also has the turret from an early Covenanter pilot model. A second Covenanter tank was recovered in May 2017 from the same farm, now the site of Denbies vineyard.

The partially buried, wrecked hulls of two tanks may be seen at Titchwell Marsh in Norfolk. Now a Royal Society for the Protection of Birds nature reserve, the area was formerly a tank gunnery range and the Covenanters were likely used as targets.Two Covenanter Bridgelayers are preserved in Australia – one at the Royal Australian Armoured Corps Tank Museum, Puckapunyal, Victoria, and one at the 1st/15th Royal New South Wales Lancers Lancer Barracks and Museum at Parramatta, New South Wales.

== Sources ==
- Bingham, James (1969). Crusader–Cruiser Mark VI. AFV Profile (No. 8). Windsor: Profile Publishing. OCLC 54349416.
- Braun, Pierre-Olivier (25 October 2011). "Surviving Cruiser Tanks" (PDF). Surviving Panzers website. Archived (PDF) from the original on 29 June 2018.
- Coombs, Benjamin (2015). British Tank Production and the War Economy, 1934–1945. London: Bloomsbury Academic. ISBN 978-1-47-422790-2.
- Crawford, Steve (2000). Tanks of World War II. Osceola, WI: MBI Publishing. ISBN 0-7603-0936-1.
- Fletcher, David (2002). Crusader Cruiser Tank 1939–1945. New Vanguard No. 14. Oxford: Osprey. ISBN 978-1-85-532512-8.
- Fletcher, David (2012). Crusader and Covenanter Cruiser Tanks 1939–45. New Vanguard. Oxford: Osprey. ISBN 978-1-78096-738-7.
- Fletcher, David (1993) [1989]. Great Tank Scandal. Vol. I. London: HMSO. ISBN 978-0-11-290460-1.
- White, B. T. (1963). British Tanks 1915–1945. London: Ian Allan. OCLC 799775831.
