= Battle of Steamroller Farm =

1943 battle in Tunisia

- Part of Operation Ochsenkopf
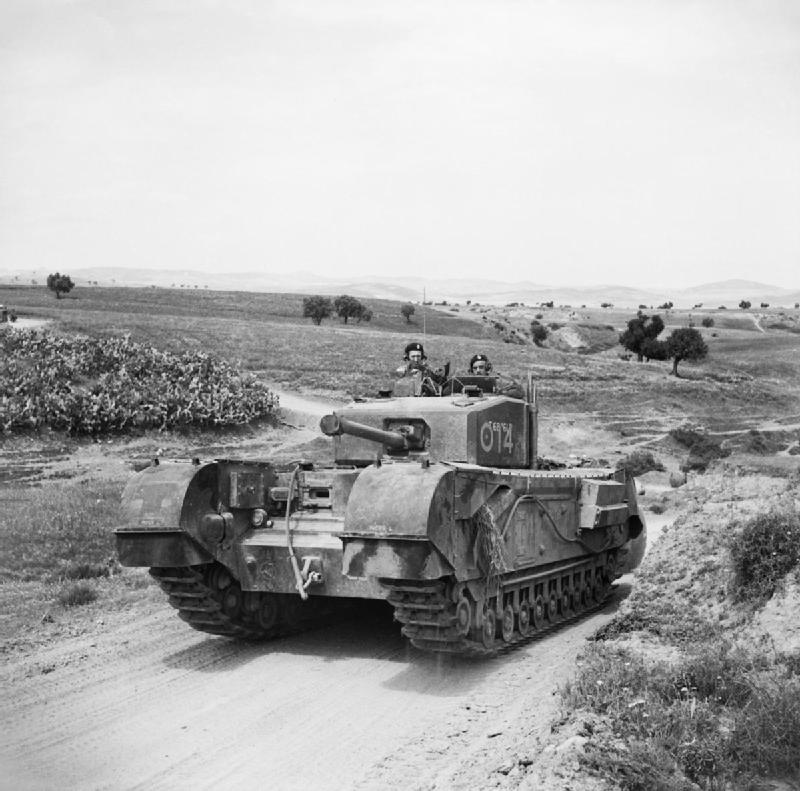
- Churchill MKIII tank in Tunisia
Date	26 February to 1 March 1943
Location	El Aroussa, Tunisia 36°27′17″N 9°30′31″E
Result	British victory

Belligerents
United Kingdom	Germany

Commanders and leaders
Nelson Russell; Derek Mills-Roberts	Joseph Schmid; Walter Koch; Gerhard Schirmer

Casualties and losses
~100 losses total (6 Commando)	150–200 officers and men (British estimate)

The Battle of Steamroller Farm took place during the Second World War between 26 February and 1 March 1943, during the Tunisian campaign, in which the Western Allies defeated the Axis powers and ended the war in North Africa. The battle was the result of a German attempt to launch an attack against the advancing British First Army in order to buy time for an attack on the British Eight Army on the Mareth line. After two days of fighting along the road between El Aroussa and Medjez El-bab, primarily at a position known as "Steamroller Farm", the Germans withdrew.

== Background ==
Following the defeat of Rommel's Afrika Korps in the Western Desert by British and Commonwealth forces at the battle of El Alamein in November 1942, and the successful occupation of Morocco and Algeria by Anglo-American forces during the same month, Axis forces had moved in to and occupied the French colony of Tunisia to forestall Allied forces and provide an area for the Afrika Korps to retreat in to. Tunisia thus formed a final bridgehead for the Axis forces of fascist Italy and Nazi Germany in North Africa.

Despite the long route from Algeria, Allied forces advancing from the west came within 20 km of Tunis by late November 1942. However, these forces were then pushed back by arriving Axis forces and by the end of 1942 the front in western Tunisia had stabilised roughly along line running from a point on the coast approximately 40 km to the west of Tunis southwards, through Medjez el Bab and El Aroussa. During the same period the British Eighth army under Montgomery had pursued the Afrika Korps through Libya, finally reaching the Mareth Line in south-eastern Tunisia by January 1943.

=== Tunisian Campaign in 1943 ===
Upon his arrival in Tunisia in January 1943, the German commander of the Afrika Korps, Erwin Rommel, dismissing the possibility of a serious threat from the Eighth Army until they had properly cleared the harbour of Tripoli, planned a series of counter-attacks against Allied forces in the west in order to knock them back. In the first of these, at Faïd Pass on 30 January 1943, Free French and US forces had been driven from the pass. Two weeks later on 14 February at Sidi Bou Zid, US forces had suffered a serious reversal and the central Tunisian town of Sbeitla had been captured. On 19 February another Axis attack was launched at the Kasserine Pass, and in a five-day battle the Americans suffered another reversal.

=== The German plan of attack ===
On 20 February 1943 the German general Hans-Jürgen von Arnim assumed command of the 5th Panzer Army, itself under Panzer Army Africa headed by Rommel. Without consulting Rommel, but with Kesselring's permission, von Arnim decided to launch a series counter-attack at three points in the west against the V Corps of the British First Army. The forces that would be used for this were Korpsgruppe Weber a battlegroup comprising a mixture of the German 334th Infantry Division, elements of the Luftwaffe Hermann Göring Division which was in the process of deploying in to Tunisia, and elements of the 10th Panzer Division, under the command of Friedrich Weber. This attack was code-named Ochsenkopf (Ox-head). Together with this, in an subsidiary attack code-named Ausladung, an armoured battlegroup under Hasso von Manteuffel was to attack along the coast at Sejenane.

The southernmost of these attacks was to be carried out by Kampfgruppe Schmid under German Luftwaffe general Joseph Schmid, commanding the leading elements of the Hermann Goering Division that had arrived in Tunisia. As part of this attack, a grouping under Walter Koch, consisting of the two battalions of the 5th German 'Fallschirmjäger' regiment, and a company of 11 tanks from the 7th Panzer Regiment, was tasked with seizing the pass at Bir el Krima and then advancing through the Mahmoud Gap, between Sidi Mahmoud and Djebel Rihane, to El Aroussa, to capture the road-junction there. The two battalions of this attack were in turn divided in to two different thrusts - the 3rd battalion commanded by Schirmer and mounted on lorries was to advance through the southern end of the Mahmoud Gap on El Aroussa along the road from Medjez El Bab, and link up with the 1st battalion advancing along Djebel Rihane in the area of El Aroussa. By this manoeuvre, the Germans sought to outflank the British position at Bou Arada further to the south.

This sector was held by the roughly 250 light infantry of 6 Commando under Lieutenant-Colonel Derek Mills-Roberts, and Y Division, an ad-hoc formation built around the 38th Irish Brigade under the command of Nelson Russell tasked with defending the Bou Arada plain. With Russell assuming the role of commander of Y Division, Lieutenant-Colonel Scott had assumed command of the Irish Brigade, with the Brigade headquarters located on the slopes of Djebel Rihane.

== Battle ==
=== The German attack: 26–27 February ===
Starting their advance before dawn on 26 February, the attack of Kampfgruppe Schmid enjoyed initial success. With a company of Fallschirmjäger riding on the tanks and the rest following in lorries, the pass at Bir El Krima was quickly over-run. By dawn a lorry-mounted troop of 6 Commando under Lieutenant Bonvin had encountered the leading elements of the German attack and engaged them near a farm designated as the meeting point of the 3rd and 1st Fallschirmjäger battalions which, because it had a steamroller in its yard, became known as "Steamroller Farm".

Thinking that Bonvin had simply encountered a German patrol, Mills-Roberts launched a series of counter-attacks with all four of the troops available to him, designed to drive them back east. Realising his mistake, Mills-Roberts then called for assistance from the divisional reconnaissance troops, who came up in Bren carriers. With the assistance of the reconnaissance force a counter-attack was launched and some of Bonvin's men returned to British lines, though a number were taken prisoner. At around noon German medium tanks (identified as Panzer IVs by Frank Barton, a member of 6 Commando) came up and the commandos, lacking anti-tank weapons and having delayed the Germans and inflicted losses on them, withdrew.

At 13:00 hours a squadron of Churchill tanks from the 142nd regiment of the Royal Armoured Corp, itself freshly arrived in the theatre and with novice crews, arrived to engage the German armour advancing on El Aroussa. During the four-hour engagement, which took place at long range (roughly 1 kilometre) the Germans scored multiple hits on the Churchills without inflicting losses, but the British claimed seven German tanks knocked out and two damaged, leaving the Germans with only two operational tanks. The British tanks, together with artillery fire, infantry of the Royal Irish Fusiliers ("the Faughs") and resistance from an armoured car squadron of the Derbyshire Yeomanry, stopped any further German advance on El Aroussa.

On the 27th the Irish Brigade launched a series of five counterattacks. These did not break through, but under their pressure the Germans fell back to Steamroller farm and dug in there.

=== Counterattack: 28 February to 1 March ===
With the El Aroussa - Medjez El Bab road cut by the German occupation of Steamroller Farm, on the evening of 27 February the commander of Y division decided to dispatch a force to probe along the road from El Aroussa toward the farm. The force selected for this task was a company of the Coldstream Guards from the newly arrived 1st Guards Brigade, a troop of four 25 pounder artillery guns, and A Squadron, 51st Royal Tank Regiment under Major Hadfield, equipped with 9 Churchill tanks. Arriving in the vicinity of Steamroller Farm, Hadfield's squadron was hit by intense defensive fire, which damaged a number of the Churchills. Two Churchills were also knocked out by an attack by Stuka dive-bombers. Two Churchills, the leading one of which was commanded by Captain Hollands, assaulted the hill behind Steamroller Farm on which two 88mm FlaK guns and several anti-tank guns had been positioned. Despite having no high-explosive ammunition for their Churchill's six-pounder gun, the steep slope of the hill, and taking a glancing hit on the turret at point-blank range from one of the 88mm guns, Hollands' tank ascended the hill and the FlaK cannons and anti-tank guns were all silenced with machine-gun fire and six-pounder armour-piercing rounds.

Cresting the hill, Hollands saw a large quantity of German personnel and vehicles located behind it, and together with the following Churchill commanded by Lieutenant Renton, opened fire on them inflicting significant losses. The Germans attempted to counter-attack with the remaining two Panzer III tanks, however these were both destroyed by Renton's Churchill.

Hollands and Renton were ordered to rejoin their squadron but the leading tank stalled and had to be given a tow start. Both made it to safety and the Germans also withdrew. The following day, the French owner of the farm arrived at El Aroussa to say that the Germans had gone and so the farm was occupied by the Guards, bringing the battle to a close.

== Aftermath ==
The tank sortie destroyed two 88 mm, two 75 mm, and two 50 mm anti-tank guns, four smaller anti-tank guns, 25 wheeled vehicles, two 3-inch mortars, the two Panzer IIIs and inflicted nearly 200 casualties. The depleted Hermann Göring Regiment had suffered many more casualties; its commander had assumed that the tank sortie was from a much bigger formation and sent a message to Fliegerführer Afrika that he had been attacked by a "mad tank battalion which had scaled impossible heights" and "compelled his ultimate withdrawal".

The attack thus blunted the Southern Horn of the German offensive. Lang had to rely on the Northern Horn for any success, but this too ended in defeat with heavy losses especially in tanks. For their actions at Steamroller Farm, Hollands received the Distinguished Service Order, the Military Cross went to Renton whilst Mitton, received the Military Medal.
