= British Official Armour Specification =

The British Official Armour Specification is a set of standards for armour construction for armoured fighting vehicles, including tanks, during the late Interwar Period and into World War II.

== Standards list ==
Standards applicable to British tanks of World War II are as follows:

- I.T.60: Face-hardened 7 to 12 mm steel plate.
- I.T.70: Thin homogeneous hard 3 to 30 mm plate.
- I.T.80: Thick homogeneous-machineable 15 mm and greater plate.
- I.T.90: Cast armour of all thicknesses.
- I.T.100: Thin homogeneous-machineable 3 to 14 mm plate.
- I.T.110: Carbon manganese steel backing plate.

== See also ==
- List of tanks of the United Kingdom
- List of World War II tanks
- Tanks of the United Kingdom by period

== Resources ==
- Thomas L. Jentz (1998). Tank Combat in North Africa: The Opening Rounds. Schiffer Military History. ISBN 0-7643-0226-4.
