= Ordnance QF 95 mm howitzer =

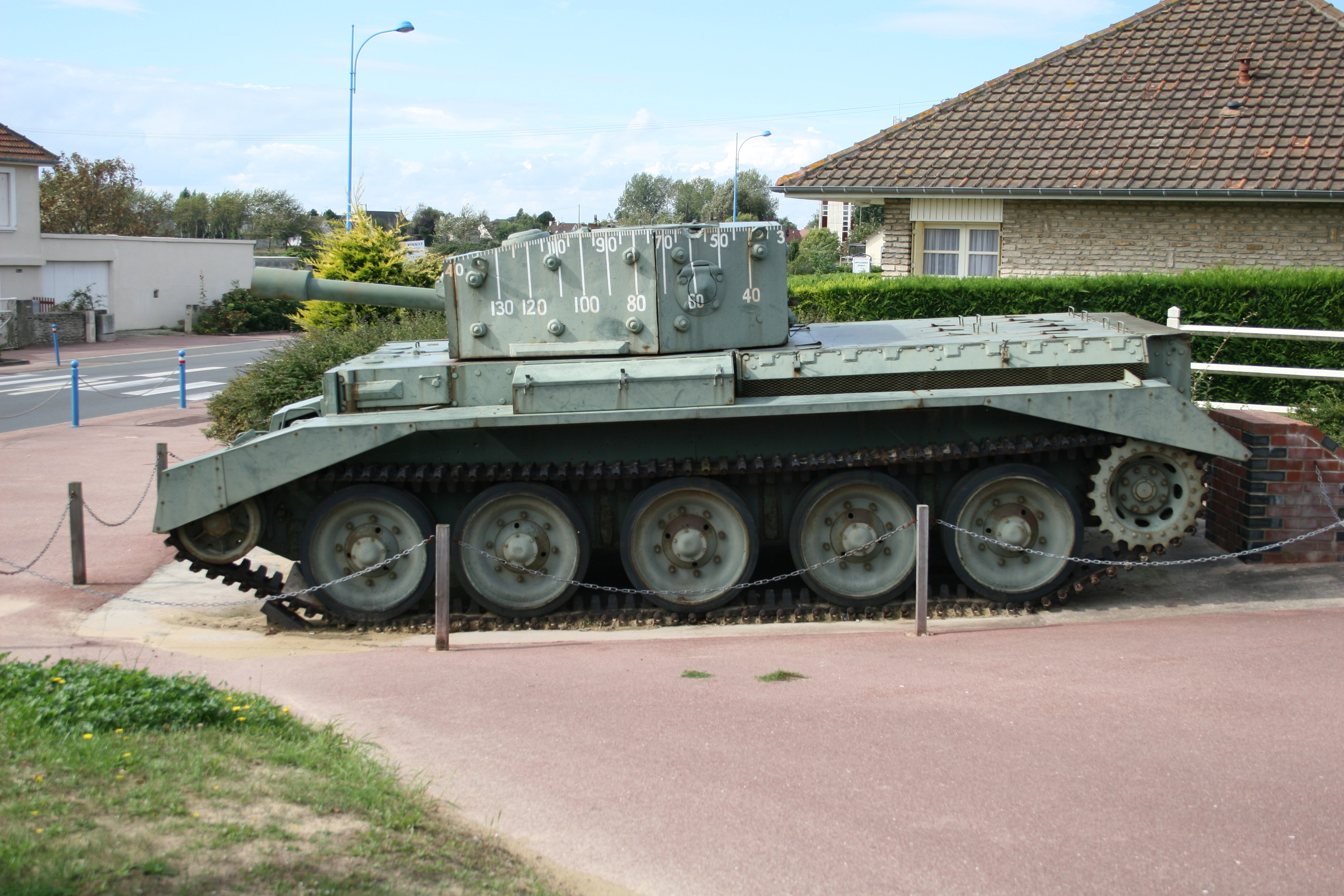
- Centaur tank with 95 mm gun
- Type: Howitzer
- Place of origin: United Kingdom

Service history
- In service: 1944 – ????
- Used by: British Army
- Wars: World War II

Production history
- Designed: 1942
- Variants: Tank and field mounts

Specifications
- Mass: 867 lb (393 kg)
- Length: 7 ft (2.1 m)
- Barrel length: 80.4 in (2.04 m)
- Shell: Fixed QF 94×206R
- Shell weight: 25 lb (11 kg)
- Calibre: 94 mm (3.7 in) L/18.65
- Recoil: Hydro pneumatic
- Carriage: Box trail
- Elevation: −5° to +30°
- Rate of fire: 7 rounds per minute
- Muzzle velocity: 330 m/s (1,100 ft/s)
- Effective firing range: 7,315 m (8,000 yd)

The Ordnance QF 95 mm howitzer was a British howitzer built in two versions during the Second World War. The tank howitzer version was accepted for service use, but the infantry version was not.

== Design and development ==
=== Tank howitzer ===
The Ordnance QF 95-mm tank howitzer was designed to be fitted to some later British tanks so they could lay smoke screens or fire HE or HEAT/Hollow Charge shell against concrete targets like pillboxes in the "close support" of infantry. A HESH round may have been issued after World War II. The 95 mm howitzer used fixed ammunition with a 25 lb (11 kg) projectile, rather than separate charge and round common for artillery howitzers. The tank howitzer was used to arm the Churchill Mark V and VIII, the Cromwell VI & VIII and the Centaur IV tanks.

The howitzer was built up from a section of a QF 3.7-inch anti-aircraft gun barrel, the breech mechanism of the Ordnance QF 25 pounder field gun/howitzer and the recoil mechanism of the Ordnance QF 6 pounder anti-tank gun. The ammunition came from the QF 3.7-inch mountain howitzer; for tank use the rounds had to be modified so they were 'fixed' rather than separate projectile and propellant. The tank howitzer version was also fitted with a large counterweight at the end of the barrel to help balance the gun. In most regiments, the 95 mm-armed tanks were issued to regimental or squadron HQ troops at the rate of two vehicles per HQ. The only variant of the Centaur tank (a Cromwell tank with a less powerful engine) to see action was the 95 mm-armed Mark IV. For the Normandy landings, the Royal Marine Armoured Support Group was formed with an establishment of eighty Mark IVs.

=== Infantry howitzer ===
The Ordnance QF 95 mm infantry howitzer was a version built as a conventional towed artillery piece. Perhaps in response to the success of the German sIG 33, a proposal was circulated in the summer of 1942 by the British Army for an infantry howitzer for direct fire against concrete structures, like pillboxes. The 95 mm tank howitzer already under development was considered to be a logical starting point for the design of the new howitzer. The infantry howitzer version was similar to the tank howitzer, except that it lacked the barrel counterweight and was placed on a box-trail carriage and given a gun shield.

Testing in 1943 showed that the recoil system and the carriage were over stressed and redesign was needed, which delayed testing and introduction of the infantry howitzer until 1944. The problems with the recoil mechanism and carriage were never fully corrected and the weapon was refused by the infantry and declared obsolete in April 1945 after several hundred examples were produced. The decision to reject the infantry howitzer may not have been based entirely on the deficiencies of the gun but due to obsolescence and organisational difficulties. The introduction of the bazooka and recoilless rifles, such as the Burney 3.45-in, may have influenced the decision to refuse the gun since they were lighter, less expensive, portable and fulfilled the direct fire use of the infantry howitzer. There was also the question of who would operate the gun; the infantry already had to support and transport anti-tank guns, anti-aircraft guns, mortars and heavy machine guns. Gun crews would need to be trained and provided with services, such as transport, supply and communications.

== Specifications ==
- Name: Ordnance QF 95 mm infantry howitzer
- Number built: 800
- Crew: 5
- Calibre: 94 mm (3.7 in)
- Barrel length: 85.5 in (2.17 m)
- Weight in action: 945 kg (2,083 lb)
- Elevation: -5 to +30 degrees
- Traverse: 8 degrees
- Rate of fire: 7 rounds per minute
- Muzzle velocity: 330 m/s (1,100 ft/s)
- Range: 7,315 m (8,000 yd)
- Ammunition
  - Smoke: smoke composition
  - HE: Amatol filling with 12 oz 4 dr (347 g) cordite propellant, No. 119B fuze (direct action and graze type)
  - HEAT: 50/50 pentolite filling, No 233 Direct Action percussion fuze
  - HESH:

== Notes and references ==
Notes

Bibliography

- Churchill tank Vehicle History and specification, HMSO
- Hogg, Ian Twentieth-Century Artillery . p. 175
- History Of The Second World War Marshall and Cavendish. p. 2079
- Land Power A Modern Illustrated Military History. p. 210
- Chamberlain and Ellis, British and American Tanks of World War II 1969 (2nd US Edition 1981 Arco)
- Fletcher, David (2019). Churchill Infantry Tank. New Vanguard 272. illustrated by Henry Morshead. Osprey. ISBN 9781472837349.
