= Crusader tank =

British WWII cruiser tank

Tank, Cruiser, Mk VI, Crusader
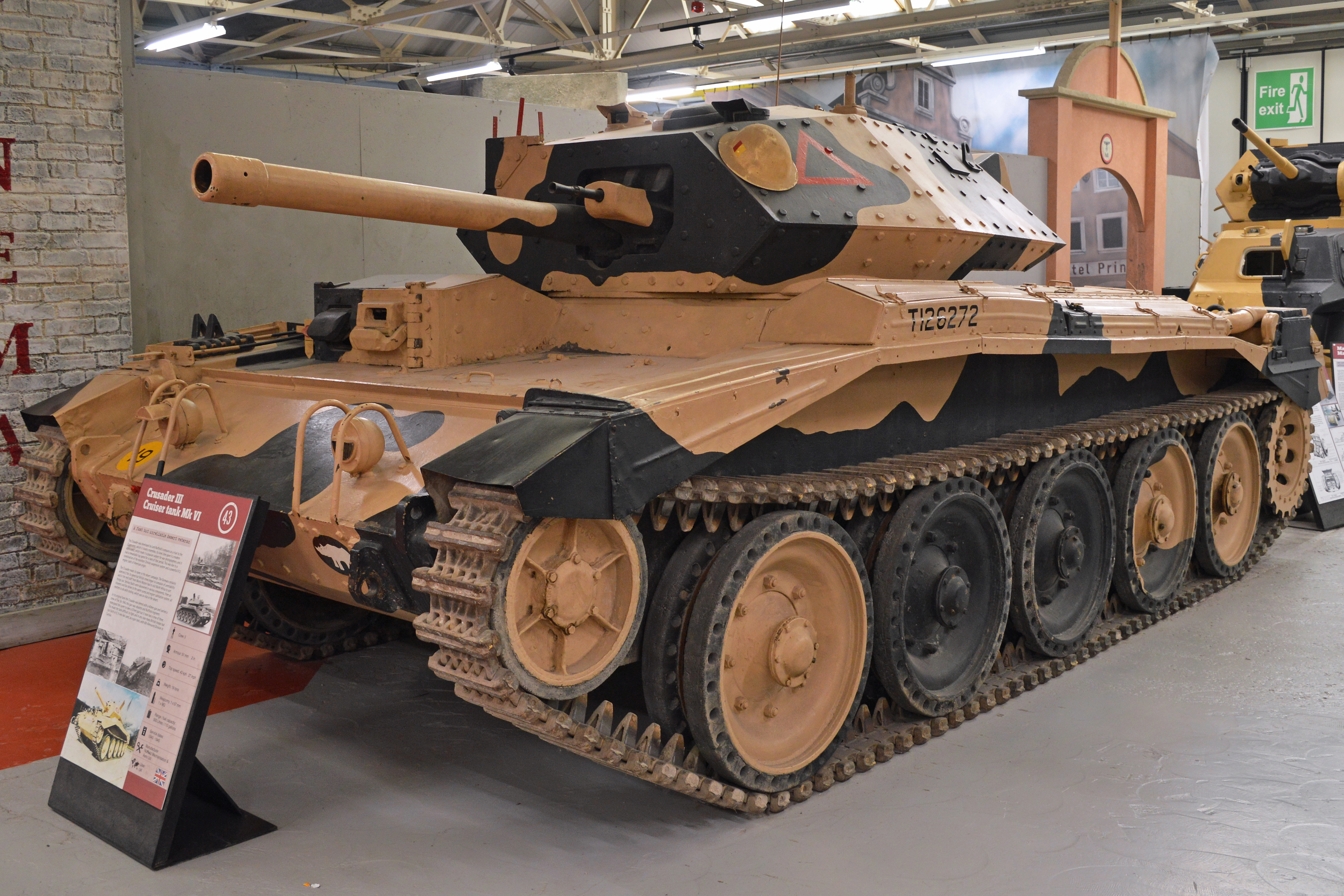
- A Crusader III on display at The Tank Museum
- Type: Cruiser tank
- Place of origin: United Kingdom

Service history
- In service: 1941–1949
- Used by: See § Operators
- Wars: World War II

Production history
- Designer: Nuffield
- Designed: 1939/1940
- Manufacturer: Nuffield Mechanizations and Aero Ltd
- Developed into: Tank, Cruiser, Mk VII Cavalier
- Produced: 1940–1943
- No. built: 5,300
- Variants: See § Variants

Specifications
- Mass: 18.8 to 19.7 long tons (19.1 to 20.0 t)
- Length: 20 ft 8.5 in (6.31 m) (Note: Overall, including auxiliary fuel tank)
- Width: 9 ft 1 in (2.77 m) (Note: With sand shields)
- Height: 7 ft 4 in (2.24 m)
- Crew: Mk III: 3 (Commander, gunner, driver); Mk I, II: 4 or 5 (+ Loader, hull gunner)
- Armour: Mk I: 40 mm (Note: Maximum on turret mantlet.); Mk II: 49 mm; Mk III: 51 mm
- Main armament: Mk I, II: 40 mm QF 2-pounder (110 rounds); Mk III: 57 mm QF 6-pounder (65 rounds)
- Secondary armament: 1 or 2 × 7.92 mm Besa machine guns (4,950 rounds)
- Engine: Nuffield Liberty Mark II, III, or IV; 27-litre V-12 petrol engine 340 bhp (250 kW) at 1,500 rpm
- Power/weight: 17 hp (13 kW) / tonne
- Transmission: Nuffield constant mesh 4-speed-and-reverse
- Suspension: Christie helical spring
- Ground clearance: 1 ft 4 in (0.41 m)
- Fuel capacity: 110 imp gal (130 US gal; 500 L) in 3 fuel tanks (+30 auxiliary)
- Operational range: 141 mi (227 km) on roads with auxiliary tanks 65 mi (105 km) cross country
- Maximum speed: Road: 26 mph (42 km/h); Off-road: 15 mph (24 km/h)
- Steering system: Wilson epicyclic steering

Crusader, in full "Tank, Cruiser Mk VI, Crusader", also known by its General Staff number A15, was a British cruiser tank during the early part of the Second World War. Over 5,000 tanks were manufactured and they made important contributions to the British victories during the North African campaign. The Crusader saw active service in Africa and the chassis of the tank was modified to create anti-aircraft, fire support, observation, communication, bulldozer and recovery vehicle variants.

The first Crusader Mark I tanks entered service in 1941 and, though manoeuvrable, they were relatively lightly armoured and under-armed. The following Crusader Mark II had a maximum armour of 49 mm (1.9 in). The main armament for the Crusader Mark I and IIs was a 40 mm Ordnance QF 2-pounder gun; the following Crusader Mark III was fitted with a 57 mm Ordnance QF 6-pounder gun at the expense of one member of the crew in the turret. This variant was more than a match for the mid-generation German Panzer III and Panzer IV medium tanks that it faced in combat. As part of the 1st Armoured Brigade, the Crusader was to prove vital during the Second Battle of El Alamein, at the siege of Tobruk and in the Tunisia campaign.

Retained in service because of delays with its replacement, by late 1942, the lack of armament upgrades, plus reliability problems in the harsh desert conditions and the appearance of uparmoured and upgunned German tanks in the Afrika Korps, saw the Crusader replaced as the main tank by US-supplied M3 Grant and then by the M4 Sherman medium tanks but it was retained in combat use until the end of the war in North Africa and after that for training in Britain.

== Design and development ==
In 1938, Nuffield Mechanizations and Aero Limited produced their A16 design for a heavy cruiser tank based on Christie suspension. Looking for a lighter and cheaper tank to build, the General Staff requested alternatives from British industry. To this end, the A13 Mk III cruiser tank, which was to enter service as the "Tank, Cruiser Mk V" (known as the Covenanter), was designed by London Midland and Scottish. Nuffield was, in 1939, offered the opportunity to take part in the production of the Covenanter.

Nuffield preferred to work on its own version of the A13, though it still provided design work for the Covenanter's turret. This new tank was adopted as "Tank, Cruiser, Mk VI Crusader", under General Staff specification A15. Although Crusader is often referred to as an improved version of the Covenanter, it was a parallel design. Both tanks were ordered "off the drawing board" without prototypes. Despite a later start, the pilot model of the Crusader was ready six weeks before the first Covenanter.

Unlike earlier "Christie cruisers" (the A13 Mark III and Mark IV tanks and the Mark V Covenanter) that were built with four road wheels, Crusader had five road wheels each side to improve weight distribution in a tank that weighed almost 20 long tons (20 t) instead of the 14 long tons (14 t) of the previous cruisers. The 32 in (810 mm)-diameter wheels were of pressed steel with solid rubber tyres. The hull sides were built up of two separated plates, with the suspension arms between them.

It had a different engine from the Covenanter, different steering system and a conventional cooling system with radiators in the engine compartment. Covenanter used a new engine design and Crusader adapted the readily available Liberty engine to fit into a lower profile engine compartment. At the left side of the front hull—a place occupied by the engine radiator in the Covenanter—was mounted a small hand-traversed auxiliary turret armed with a Besa machine gun. The auxiliary turret was awkward to use and was often removed in the field or remained unoccupied.

The A13 Mk III Covenanter and the A15 Crusader designs used the same main turret. The turret was polygonal—with sides that sloped out then in again—to give maximum space on the limited turret ring diameter. Early production vehicles had a "semi-internal" cast gun mantlet, which was quickly replaced in production by a better protected larger cast mantlet with three vertical slits for the main gun, a coaxial Besa machine gun, and the sighting telescope. There was no cupola for the commander, who instead had a flat hatch with the periscope mounted through it.

The main armament, as in other British tanks of the period, was balanced so that the gunner could control its elevation through a padded shaft against his right shoulder rather than using a geared mechanism. This fitted well with the British doctrine of firing accurately on the move.

== Further development ==
=== Crusader III ===
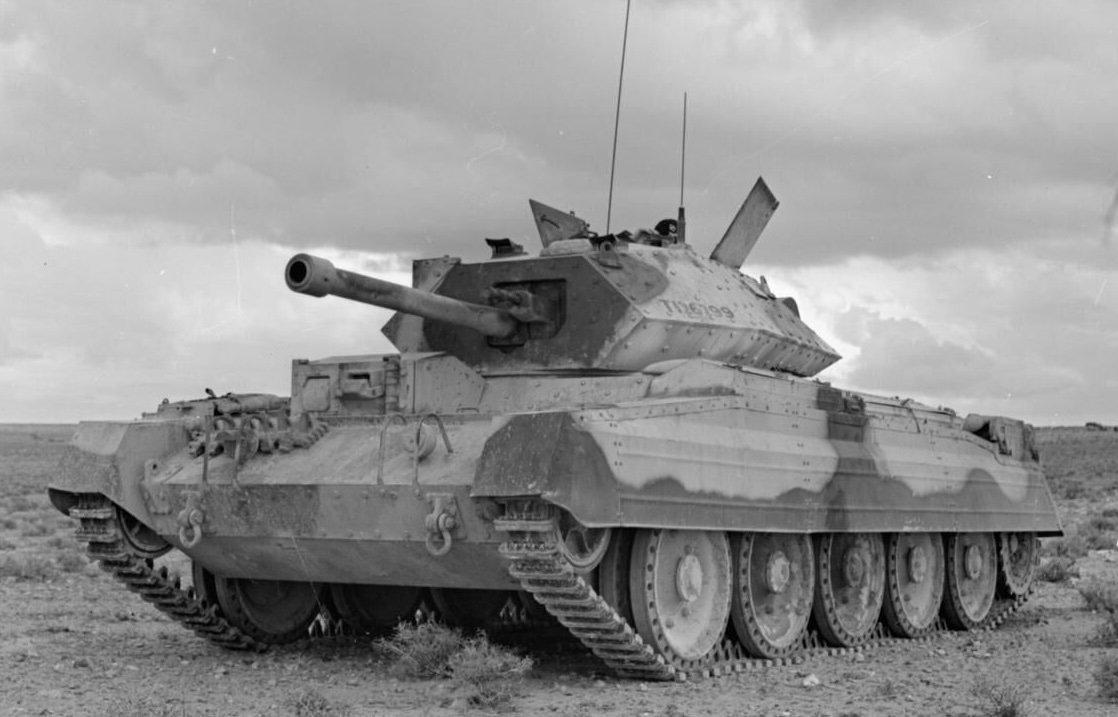
Crusader Mk III in North Africa

When it was understood that there would be delays in the introduction of successor heavy cruiser tanks (the Cavalier, Centaur and Cromwell) and the need for cruiser tanks, the Crusader was up-gunned with the 57 mm 6-pounder, the first British tank to mount this gun. Design work for a new turret started in March 1941, but Nuffield was not involved until late in the year, when they adapted the existing turret with a new mantlet and hatch.

The turret also received an extractor fan to clear fumes from the firing of the gun. The larger gun restricted turret space, so the crew was reduced to three, with the commander also acting as gun loader, a role previously performed by the wireless operator. The auxiliary turret space was given over to ammunition stowage.

Crusader III also saw the introduction of the Mk. IV Liberty engine, fixing many of the reliability issues previously encountered. This featured the Mk. III engine's later updated water pumps along with a shaft drive replacing chain drive for the cooling fans.

Production started in May 1942 and 144 were complete by July. The Crusader III first saw action, with about 100 participating, at the Second Battle of El Alamein in October 1942.

The Crusader was converted to a mobile armoured observation post for direction of artillery. The turret was fixed in place, the gun was removed and a dummy barrel fitted to give it the same outward appearance of a regular tank. With no requirement for ammunition, the interior was given over to the radios, two No. 19 radios and No. 18 radio, map boards and related equipment. The Royal Artillery could then operate the OP tank up front among the fighting units directing artillery fire in their support.

=== Crusader AA tanks ===
The Crusader III was also used to create self propelled anti-aircraft guns. First was the Crusader III, AA Mk I which replaced the 6-pounder in the enclosed turret with a Bofors 40 mm anti-aircraft gun with an autoloader and powered mounting in an open-topped turret. The crew numbered four: gun commander, gun layer, loader, and driver. It was intended for use by organic AA units in armoured formations.

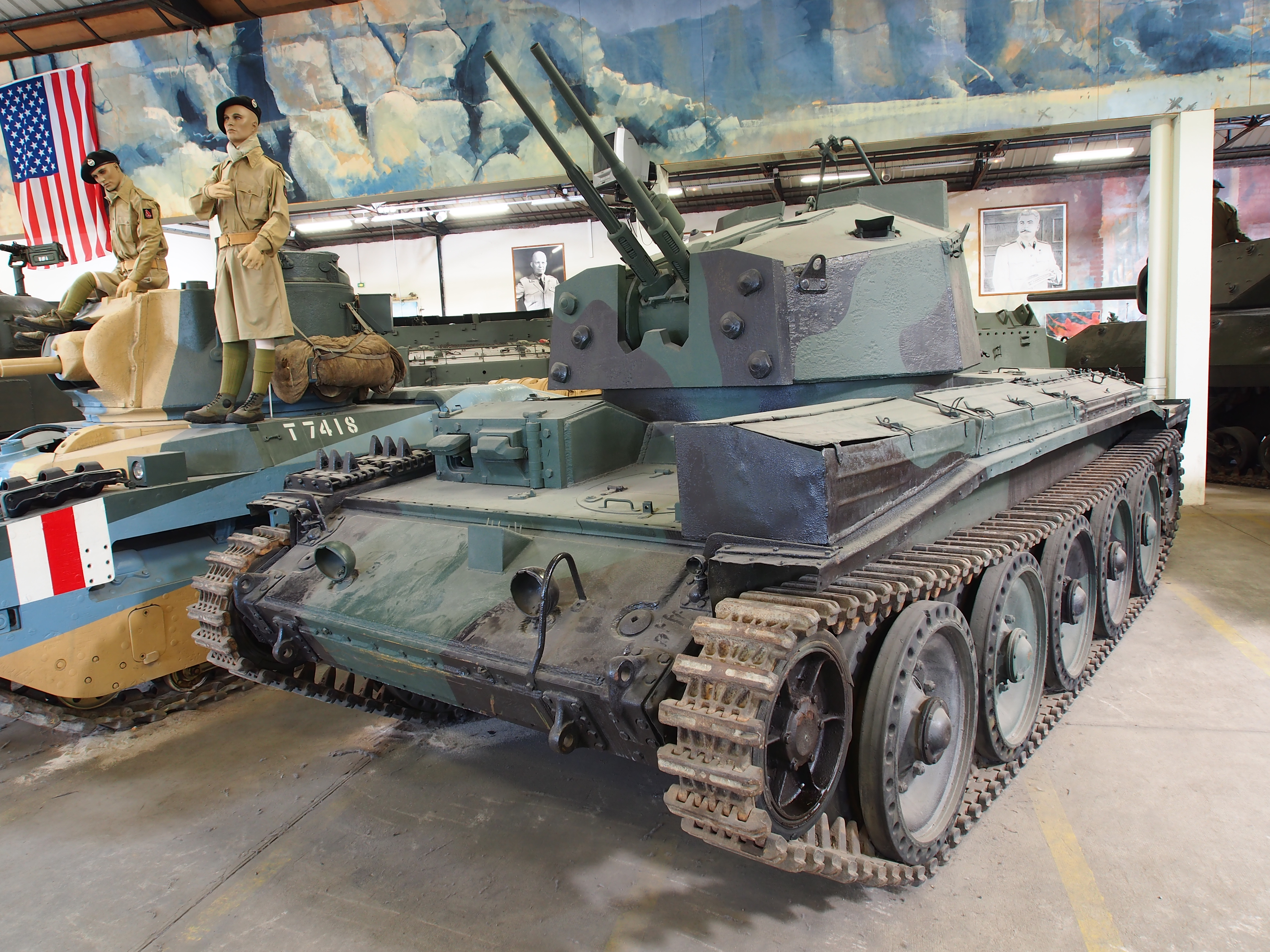
Crusader AA Mk III in the Musée des Blindés, France.

After trials, it was superseded by the Crusader III, AA Mk II, which was armed with twin Oerlikon 20 mm guns for anti-aircraft use. The prototype appeared from Morris Motors in the summer of 1943, the pilot model being issued for testing in June. The armor thickness in the turret was 30 mm at the front and 14 mm on the sides and 17 mm on the rear. The guns were housed in a small, multi-sided polygonal turret with heavy armour, but poor situational visibility for spotting approaching aircraft. The crew numbered four: the commander/gunner, (Note: Also acted as radio operator.) two loaders, and driver. The tank carried 600 rounds of ammunition, in 60-round magazines.

After evaluations, the tank was urgently redesigned as the Crusader III, AA Mk III. The Mk III differed from the Mk II:

- An improved turret with raised "lips" in the turret aperture, and a narrower aiming frame.
- An additional single .303 (7.7 mm) Vickers K machine gun in an armoured jacket, between the 20mm guns.
- The position of the radio, which was moved to the hull in order to free some space inside the turret. The driver now also acted as the radio operator, instead of the commander.

After the failure of the Crusader AA Mk I, the Royal Artillery created a new project based on the Crusader chassis, officially called 40 mm SP AA Gun (Tracked). The design was a 40 mm Bofors gun mounted directly on a Crusader III hull top with its standard shield. Another similar project was the 20 mm SP AA Gun (Tracked), which mounted three 20 mm Oerlikons (Note: More likely these were the similar Polsten gun.) instead of the Bofors. Both were produced in very limited quantities, and were for used by LAA (SP) regiments. They were intended as a stop gap to ensure AA cover in the immediate landings of D-day but were retained in the beach head until late 1944. (Note: another source disputed that the Oerlikon-armed Crusaders were used only for training.) After the Crusader chassis had worn out, the AA mountings were transferred to trucks.

=== Gun Tractor ===
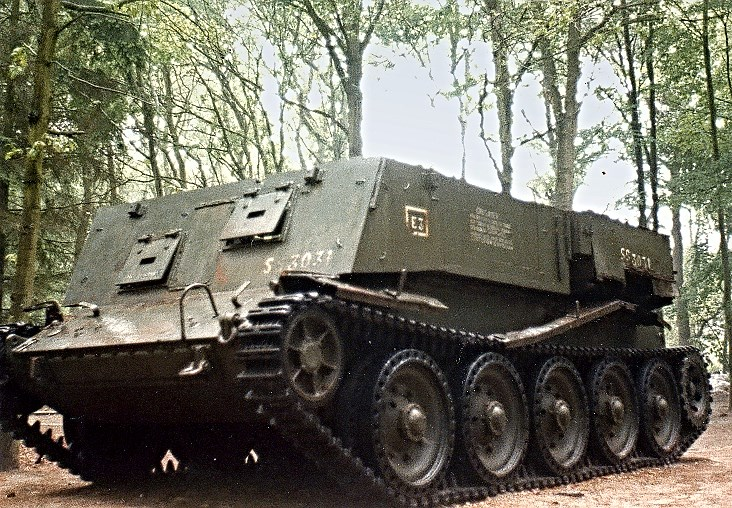
Preserved Crusader gun tractor at Overloon museum

The Crusader gun tractor came out of a need for a tracked vehicle that could tow the heavy 76.2 mm QF 17-pounder anti-tank gun, which resulted in the Crusader II, Gun Tractor Mk I. It was a Crusader tank hull with a simple boxy superstructure replacing that of the gun tank. The 14 mm (0.55 in) thick structure protected the driver and the gun crew of six. The tractor also carried ammunition on the rear and within the crew area.

Although nearly as heavy as the gun tank, it was still capable of high speed and was officially limited to 27 mph (43 km/h). This was still hard on the towed 17-pdr guns. They were used in northwest Europe from the Normandy landings of 1944 to the end of the war in 1945.

=== Other developments ===
Crusader tanks could be fitted with an Anti-Mine Roller Attachment (AMRA) Mk Id, a mine clearing device consisting of four heavy rollers suspended from a frame. Weight of the rollers could be increased by filling them with water, sand etc.

Crusaders were used for experimentation such as a flotation kit, consisting of two pontoons attached to hull sides, special blades attached to tracks to propel the vehicle in water and a cowl over engine air intakes and cooling louvres.

== Performance ==
Initial performance of the Crusader was found to be better than the comparable M3 Stuart light tanks. Despite reliability problems, the tanks formed the primary unit for British cruiser tank armoured regiments, while the Stuart was used for reconnaissance.

The Crusader suffered from chronic reliability problems in desert use. Tanks arriving in North Africa were missing many of the essential tools and servicing manuals needed to maintain operation; these had been stolen or lost in transit. As tanks broke down, the lack of spare parts meant that many components were replaced with worn parts recovered from other tanks. When the tanks were returned to the base workshops upon reaching service intervals, many were serviced with components that had already reached their design lifespan. A rapid increase in manufacturing output caused quality problems as inexperienced workers began assembling tanks. This placed further pressure on the receiving base workshops that had to carry out overhauls.

The new tanks also had a number of design flaws that needed to be worked out. The reconfiguration of the Mk. III Liberty engine into a flatter format to fit into the Crusader engine compartment had badly affected the tank's water pumps and cooling fan arrangements, both of which were critical in the hot desert temperatures. Several official and unofficial local modifications were applied to improve reliability and conserve water, which otherwise had to be prioritised on keeping the vehicles running. Rectification of these issues took a very long time, by which time confidence in the Crusader had been lost. Calls were made at various points for the vehicles to be replaced with the Valentine infantry tank or US-made M3 Grant tank.

More and more Crusaders were returned to base workshops, leading to a shortage of battle-ready tanks and a massive backlog of repair works to be completed. The number of operational vehicles dwindled, and US-made replacements were brought in.

While the 2-pounder gun had good performance when the tank was introduced, ammunition supply was focused on solid armour-piercing (AP) rounds. When German tanks moved to face-hardened armour, effective Armour-piercing, capped, ballistic capped (APCBC) ammunition was not available. By the time it was, German tanks had adapted specifically to counter it. Delays in producing the next generation of cruiser tanks meant the Crusader was up-armed with the 57mm 6-pounder gun, that had much better anti-tank performance.

In keeping with a highly mobile cruiser tank, the vehicle had lighter armour than the Axis tanks that it encountered. It was among the first to have additional armour fitted to the ammunition storage. This greatly improved vehicle survivability with only a slight reduction in the number of rounds that could be carried. A significant area of concern was the driver's compartment, the side of which had been left exposed by the removal of the secondary Besa machine gun turret. The angle left behind became a shot trap, with some shells being deflected into the tank.

Despite the many problems, the Crusader was successful in combat against Axis tanks, using its better mobility and greater capability to fire on the move to strike at vehicle weak spots. This caused a change in German tactics, whereby Axis tanks would feign retreat, drawing Crusader units onto an anti-tank gun screen. With no high explosive (HE) ammunition, the Crusader struggled to engage the anti-tank screens. This situation continued until the introduction of US-produced vehicles, such as the Grant and then the Sherman, with dual-purpose 75 mm guns.

== Service history ==
=== North Africa ===
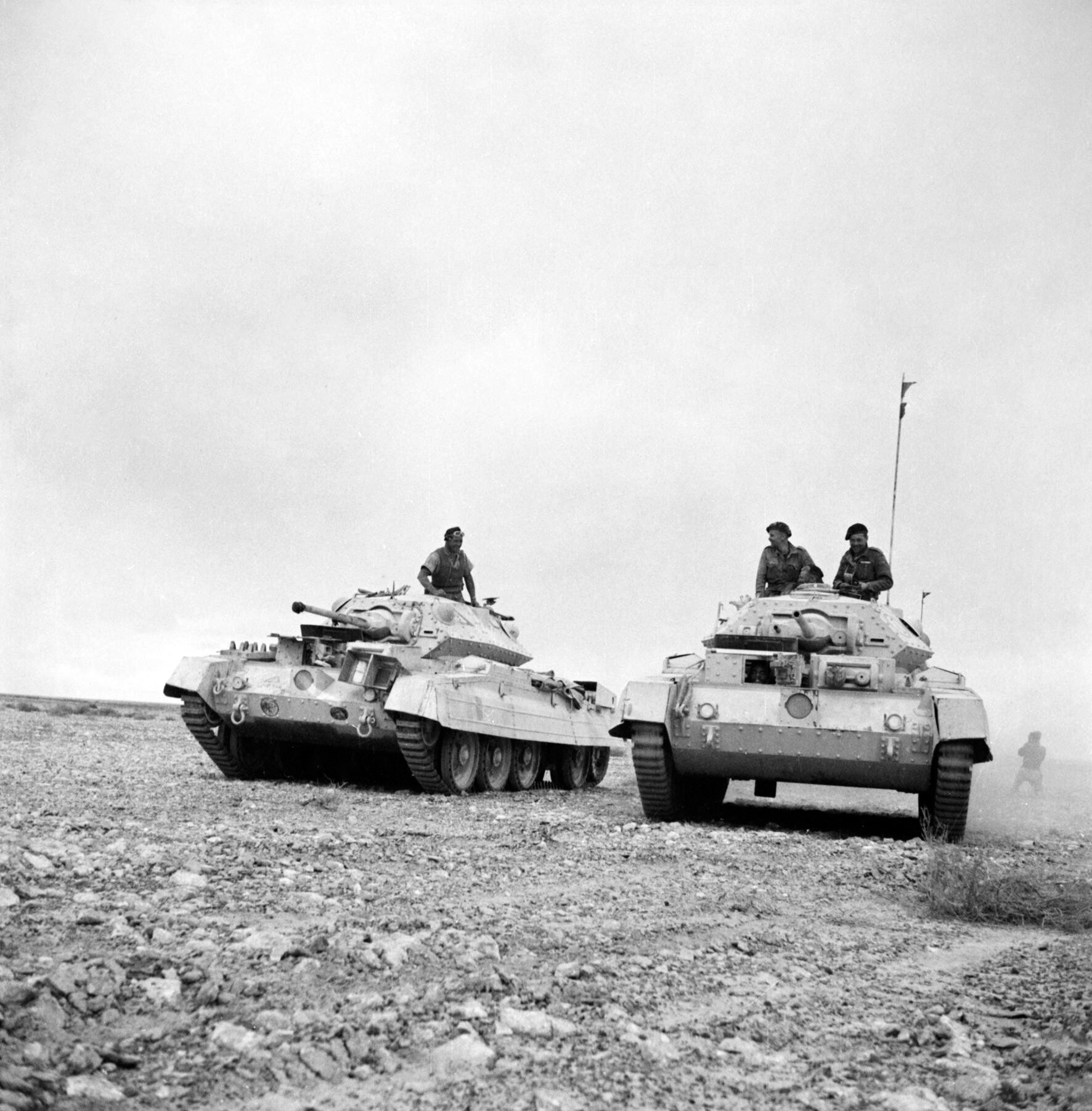
Crusader I tanks in Western Desert, 26 November 1941, with "old" gun mantlets and auxiliary Besa MG turret

With the Axis forces in North Africa having pushed the British back to the Egyptian border and the remaining British armour being a mixed force of older tanks with a few Matilda infantry tanks, tanks were hurriedly shipped via the Mediterranean in Operation Tiger and Operation Splice, arriving on 12 May 1941. There were sufficient Crusaders to equip the 6th Royal Tank Regiment (6th RTR) which with the older cruiser tanks of 2nd Royal Tank Regiment (2nd RTR) formed the 7th Armoured Brigade. The rest of the tanks were Matilda infantry tanks for the 4th Armoured Brigade giving the 7th Armoured Division four tank regiments.

Although there was pressure from London for the 7th Armoured Division to go into action, outfitting for the desert and training delayed the first use of Crusaders until Operation Battleaxe, an attempt to relieve the siege of Tobruk in June. As the brigade swept round the flank, the Crusaders were caught by concealed anti-tank guns and lost 11 tanks. The 6th RTR lost further tanks to action and defects in the fighting withdrawal during the next two days. The 7th Armoured Brigade was re-equipped with more Crusaders but as the brigade had been expanded by the addition of 7th Hussars, there were not sufficient Crusaders to replace the older cruiser tanks.

The 22nd Armoured Brigade comprising three inexperienced armoured regiments equipped with Crusaders, transferred to North Africa to bring the 7th Armoured up to a strength of three armoured brigades. (Note: 2nd Royal Gloucestershire Hussars, 3rd County of London Yeomanry (Sharpshooters) and 4th County of London Yeomanry (Sharpshooters)) The 8th Hussars was added to the 4th Armoured Brigade but these had to be equipped with M3 Stuart light tanks as there were still insufficient cruisers. The 22nd Armoured Brigade was able to take part in Operation Crusader in November 1941.

In Operation Crusader, the two British corps were disposed such that they could not support each other but it was expected that, as the British outnumbered the German and Italian forces in tanks, the tank against tank battles would be decided in their favour. In the fighting, Rommel did not put his tanks en masse into action against the British ones, and the large numbers of German anti-tank guns working offensively with the tanks and infantry proved effective. The Germans were mostly equipped with the PaK 38, a long-barrelled 50 mm gun with a range of 1,000 yd (910 m). The Crusader's 2-pounder (40 mm) gun was as effective as the short-barrelled 50 mm of the Panzer III, although it was out-ranged by the short-barrelled 75 mm of the Panzer IV. The Italians were mostly equipped mostly with 47 mm anti-tank guns and the M13/40 tanks armed with this gun performed well against the Crusader. At the First Battle Of Bir El Gobi the Italians destroyed 52 Crusaders.

Although the Crusader was faster than any of the tanks it opposed, its potential was limited by a relatively light QF 2-pounder gun, thin armour, and mechanical problems. A particular tactical limitation was the lack of a high-explosive shell for the main armament (these existed but were never supplied). Axis tank forces developed an extremely effective method of dealing with attacking tank forces by retiring behind a screen of concealed anti-tank guns. The pursuing tanks could then be engaged by the artillery. With the German anti-tank guns out of range of the tanks' machine guns and without a high-explosive shell to return fire, the tanks were left with the equally unpalatable options of withdrawing under fire or trying to overrun the gun screen.

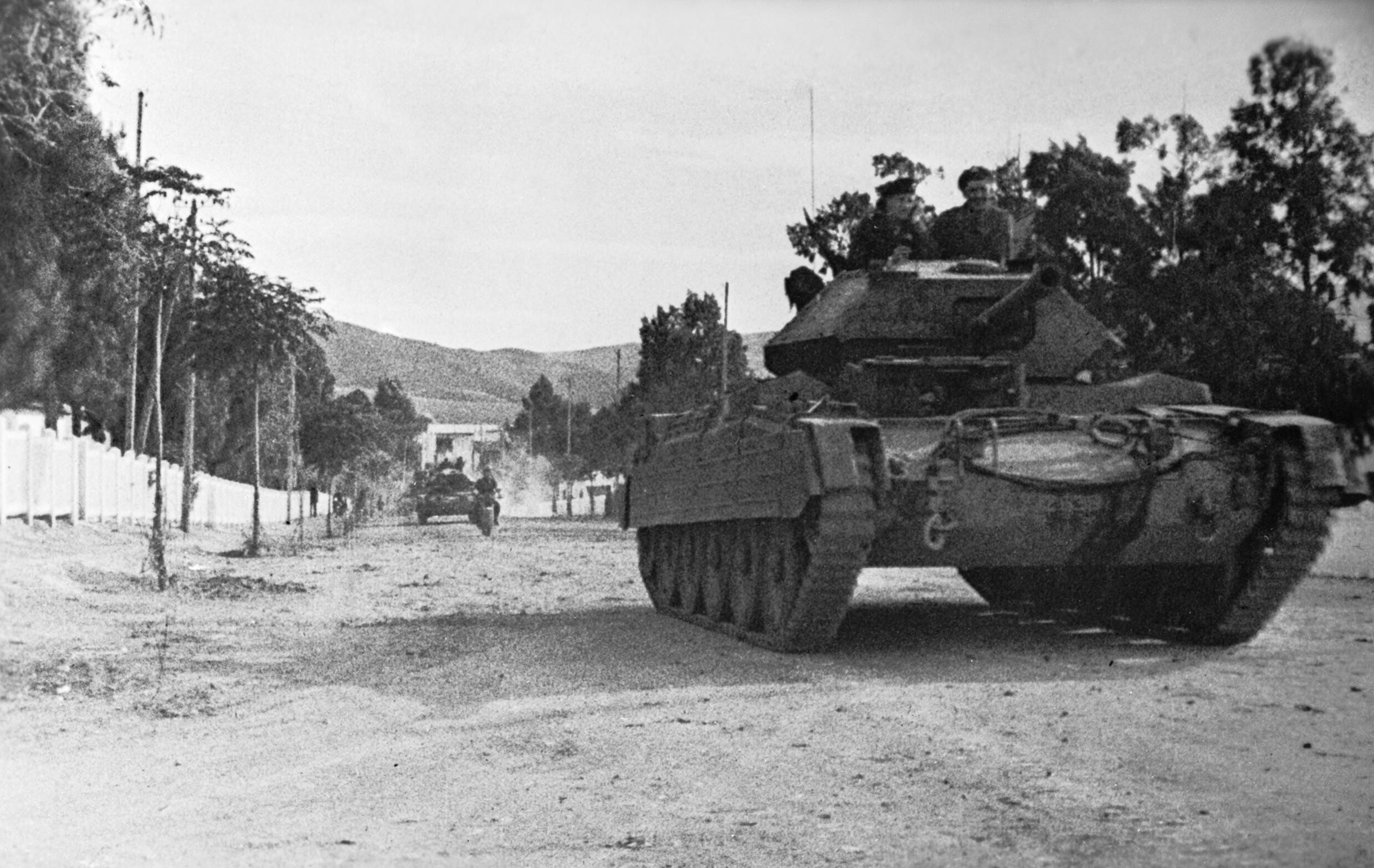
Crusader Mk III tanks in Tunisia, 31 December 1942

The Crusader proved prone to "brew up" when hit, a problem that was identified as being due to the ammunition being ignited by hot metal penetrating the unprotected racks. The angled underside of the turret created shot traps that deflected rounds downward, through the hull roof.

The Crusader proved unreliable in the desert. This started with their transport from Britain to North Africa. Poor preparation and handling caused problems that had to be rectified before they could be passed to the regiments and ate into the supply of spare parts. Once in use, the sand caused erosion in the cooling system and the stresses of hard cross-country travel caused oil leaks between the engine block and the cylinders. Since there were few tank transporters or railways in the desert, the tanks had to travel long distances on their tracks, causing further wear.

By the end of 1941, there was only one brigade, the 2nd, which was operating with only Crusaders. In March 1942, US-built Grant medium tanks arrived and replaced one in three Crusader squadrons. While the Grant with its effective 75 mm gun gave better firepower against anti-tank guns and infantry, had better armour and was more mechanically reliable, it was slower, limiting the Crusaders when they had to operate together. From May 1942, Mk IIIs (with the 57 mm 6-pounder gun) were delivered. Of the 840 tanks available to the British, 260 were Crusaders. The German tanks they were facing were improved types with face-hardened frontal armour, which caused 2-pounder shot to shatter rather than penetrate.

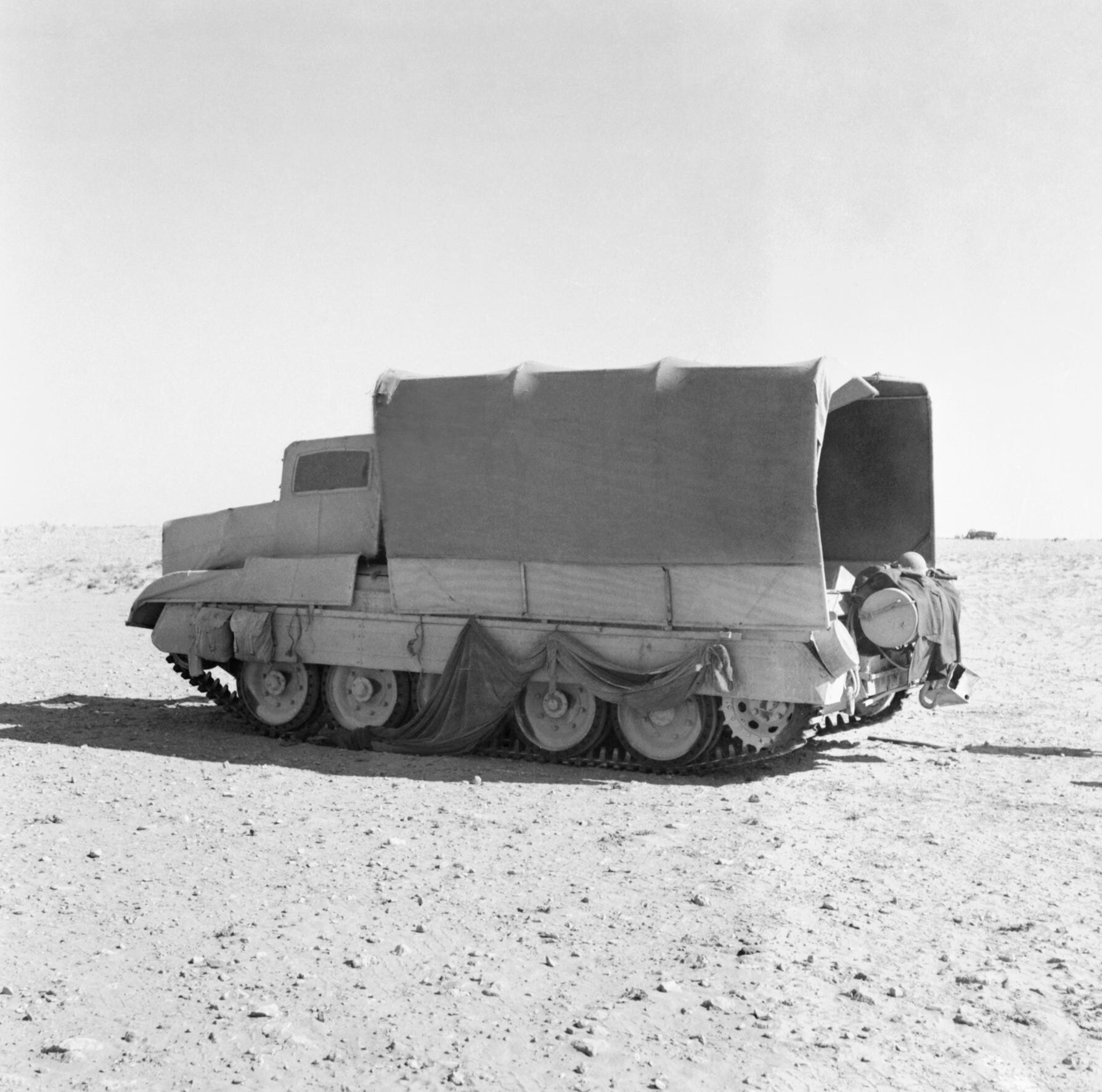
Crusader III in Operation Bertram, the deception before Alamein, with 'Sunshade' camouflage

As part of British deception operations, Crusaders could be issued with "Sunshade", which was a metal framework with canvas covering that disguised the tank as a lorry to German aerial reconnaissance. Dummy tanks were also deployed.

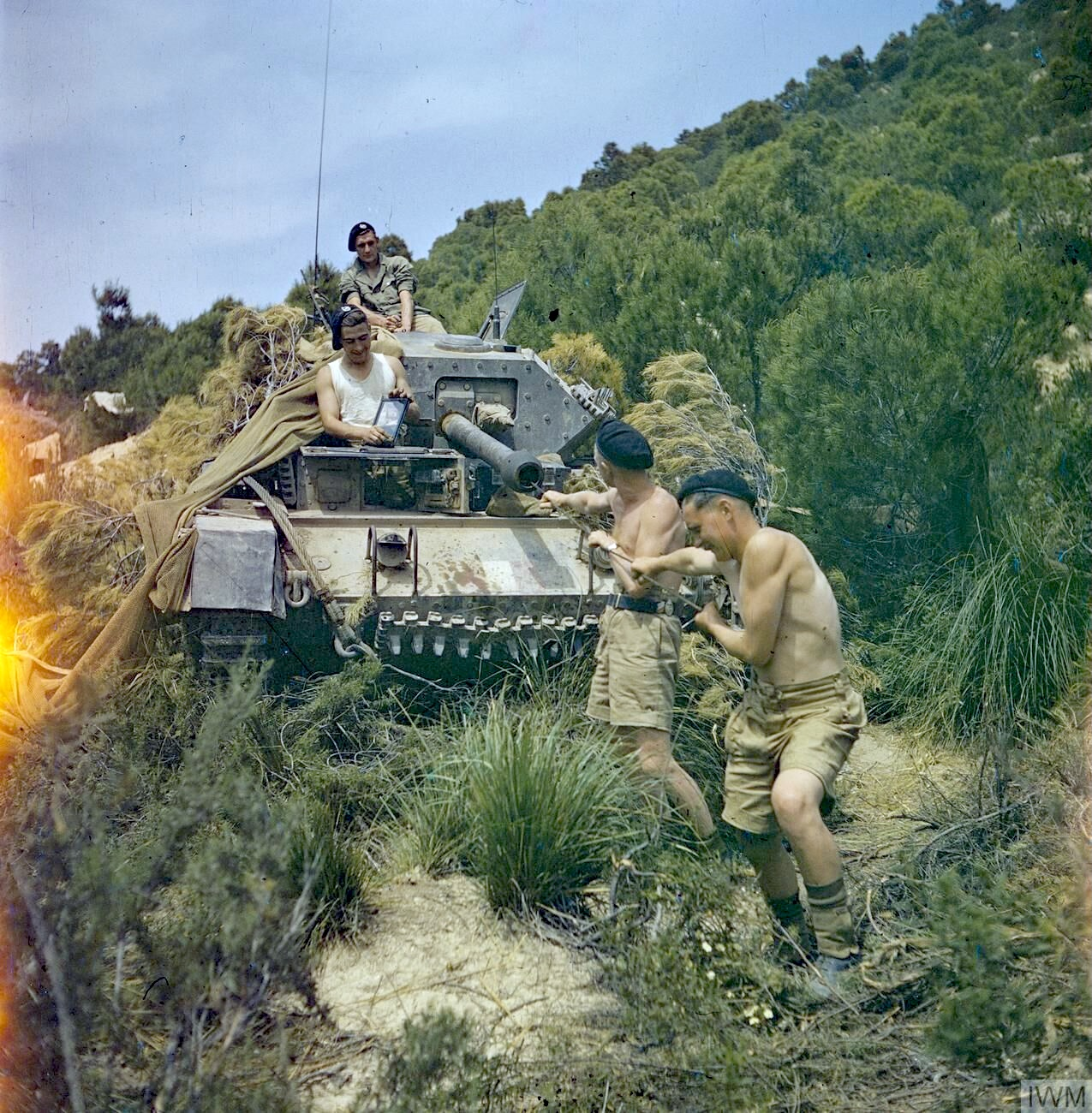
Cleaning the barrel of the 6-pdr in Tunisia

Later in the campaign, shipping was improved, Nuffield put an engineering team in Egypt, and crews were better at preventing problems but the reputation of the Crusader could not recover.

After Montgomery took over command, the imbalance between British and German armour was redressed by better control and the addition of more American-supplied Grant and Sherman tanks. The Crusader was replaced in the main line of battle and used for "light squadrons" trying to flank the enemy when it engaged the heavier units. The 9th Australian Infantry Division operated Crusaders for reconnaissance and liaison.

The First Army landed as part of the Tunisia campaign; some of its units were using the Crusader and these saw action from 24 November. These were not solely Crusader regiments but mixed Crusader and Valentine tanks; within each squadron, two troops were Crusader IIIs, and there were Crusader II CSs attached to the Squadron HQ. These units of the 26th Armoured Brigade were used as an independent armoured column, "Blade Force", with the 78th Infantry Division. (Note: The 17th/21st Lancers, the remaining regiments of the Brigade, the Lothian and Border Horse and 16th/5th Lancers, did not arrive until December) The operations of Blade Force were on terrain different from the desert of the earlier campaigns and the fighting took place with smaller numbers of vehicles. These actions were similar to what would be seen later in Europe. The 1st Army converted to Shermans during the Tunisia campaign but Crusaders remained in use with the Eighth Army for longer. The Crusaders saw out the rest of the North Africa campaign, taking part at the Battle of the Mareth Line and the Battle of Wadi Akarit. Their last actions were Operation Vulcan and Operation Strike which saw the total defeat of the Axis in Tunisia.

=== Other use ===
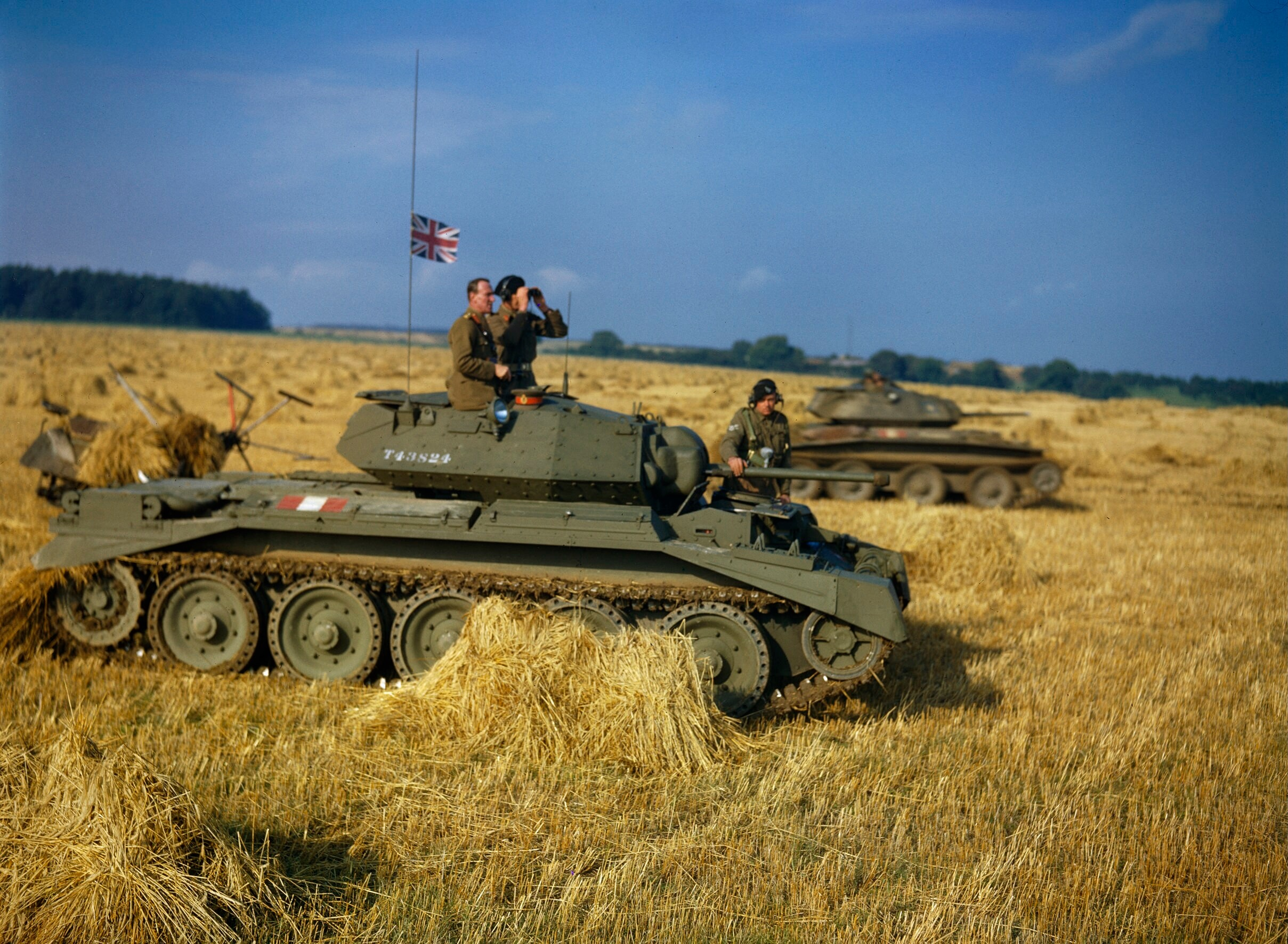
General Bernard Paget, and Major General Miles Dempsey in a Crusader II, with in the background a Covenanter, during an exercise in Yorkshire, 1942

After the completion of the North African Campaign, the availability of better tanks, such as the Sherman and Cromwell, relegated the Crusader to secondary duties, such as anti-aircraft mounts or gun tractors. In these roles, it served for the remainder of the war. The Crusader, along with the Covenanter, equipped regiments at home; particularly those of the 11th Armoured Division. A Crusader bulldozer was developed but not used operationally. One of these bulldozer tanks was converted for removing munitions following a fire at Royal Ordnance Factory Kirkby.

The Crusader anti-aircraft guns were designed for use in North-West Europe but given Allied air superiority, none of the AA versions saw much action against aircraft but a few (specially with the 1st Polish Armoured Division) were used against ground targets (mainly soft targets and/or infantry). The AA troops (attached to HQ squadrons) were disbanded after the Normandy landings.

An AA Crusader wireless operator/gun loader recounted arriving in Normandy in Crusaders in Mid July 1944 but were switched to Cromwell fairly quickly:

We had arrived originally in Normandy as a troop of Crusader anti-aircraft tanks, each one equipped with a couple of Oerlikon 20 mm cannon. We waited with H.Q. Squadron, wondering if indeed we were ever going to get moving - who needed tanks as anti-aircraft cover anyway? There wasn't an enemy aircraft to be seen! The only time we saw any aircraft action was when we were attacked by low-flying 'friendly' American fighter planes - but that's another story.

The situation must eventually have registered with someone, somewhere, because after a week or so we turned our useless Crusaders in, were given Cromwells and became an operational troop with 'A' Squadron of the Regiment.

The Crusader gun tractors operated with 76.2 mm Ordnance QF 17-pounder anti-tank gun regiments attached to armoured divisions and with XII Corps. One such unit was 86 Anti-Tank Regiment, Royal Artillery, part of XII Corps. In 86, the Crusader gun tractor replaced earlier Morris C8 gun tractors in two out of the four batteries. Unit veterans reported that the Crusader was popular with the crews and were often driven by former Armoured Corps drivers seconded to the Royal Artillery because of their driving experience. Some veterans of regiment 86 claimed they removed the 'governors' that normally limited tank speeds and credited an empty Crusader with speeds up to 55 mph (89 km/h). They also claimed to be able to outrun Military Police motorcycles, which were limited to a wartime speed of 50 mph (80 km/h) due to low grade petrol.

One Crusader was used for testing the 600 hp (450 kW) Rolls-Royce Meteor engine, the increased horsepower over the standard Liberty engine giving a maximum speed in excess of 40 mph (64 km/h).

Post-war, a Crusader was modified with a 5.5-inch (140 mm) Medium Gun installed at the front of the vehicle, facing backwards. It was for testing purposes only, as part of the FV305 self-propelled gun project.

The turret of a Crusader tank was used by the French Far East Expeditionary Corps to defend the city of Hanoi at the beginning of the first Indochina War.

== Variants ==
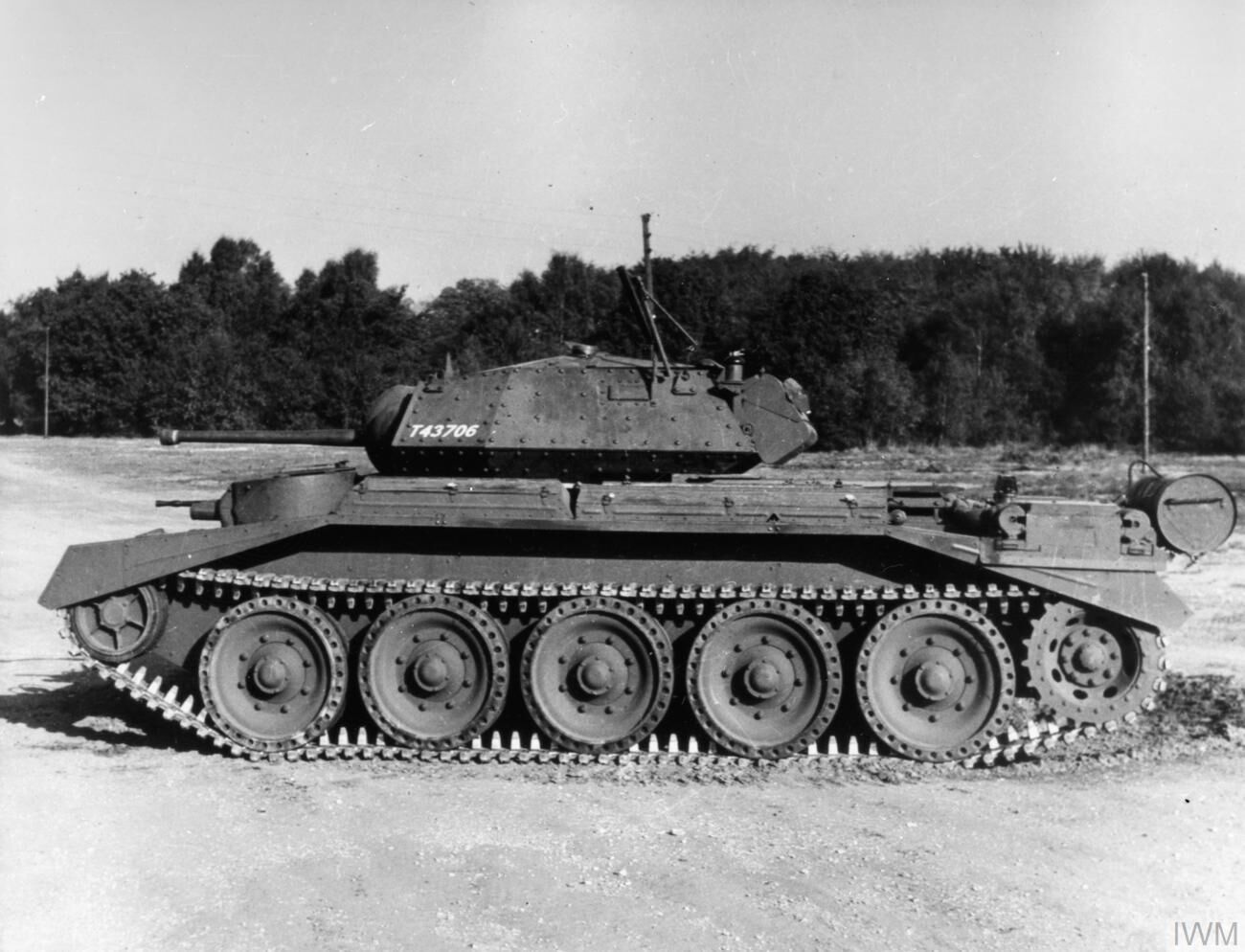
Crusader II with auxiliary turret

- Crusader I (Cruiser Mk VI) — Original production version. The auxiliary turret was often removed in the field, eliminating the hull machine gunner position.
  - Crusader I CS (Cruiser Mk VI CS) — Mounted a QF 3-inch (76.2 mm) howitzer in the turret instead of the 2-pounder.
- Crusader II (Cruiser Mk VIA) — Had increased armour on hull front and turret front. As with the Mk I, the auxiliary turret was often removed.
  - Crusader II CS (Cruiser Mk VIA CS) — Mounted a QF 3-inch (76.2 mm) howitzer in the turret.
  - Crusader II Command — fitted with dummy gun and two No. 19 radios.
  - Crusader II, Gun Tractor Mk I — Crusader II tank hull with a simple boxy superstructure replacing that of the gun tank, which protected the driver and the gun crew of six. The tractor also carried ammunition on the rear and within the crew area, and officially limited to 27 mph (43 km/h). It was used to tow the 76.2 mm QF 17-pdr anti-tank guns.
- Crusader III (Cruiser Mark VIB) — Up-gunned to the 57 mm QF 6-pdr gun, crew reduced to 3, and the auxiliary turret was removed entirely.
  - Crusader III, AA Mk I
  - Crusader III, AA Mk II
  - Crusader III, AA Mk III
- Crusader ARV Mk I — Armoured recovery vehicle based on turretless Crusader hull. One prototype was built in 1942.

== Operators ==
Crusader self-propelled gun of the Argentine Army.

- Argentina – Some Crusader gun tractors sold after the war were converted to self-propelled guns, with French 75 mm or 105 mm gun installed in a large, boxy superstructure.
- Australia
  - One squadron of the 9th Division Cavalry Regiment; North Africa (1941–43)
  - At least one Crusader was trialled in Australia (1941) by the 1st Armoured Division
- Canada
- Egypt – 2 Battalions (around 60 tanks) of the Egyptian Army Cavalry and Armoured Corps used it till the early 1960s. Along with 1 Battalion of Crusader AA as Anti-Aircraft Artillery from 1944 till the late 1960s. Saw action in the Suez War in Anti-aircraft role.
- Free French Forces
- Germany – Captured vehicles used in the 15th Panzer Division. Designated Kreuzer Panzerkampfwagen Mk VI 746 (e).
- Italy – Captured vehicles used in the 133rd Littorio Armoured Division.
- Netherlands
- Poland – Used by the 1st Armoured Division
- South Africa
- United Kingdom

== Surviving vehicles ==
A Crusader II at the South African National Museum of Military History

Around 21 tanks survive in various degrees of preservation, ranging from running-condition museum vehicles to wrecks. Eight survive in various collections in South Africa.

Examples include the Crusader III in running condition at The Tank Museum in the United Kingdom. The Musée des Blindés in France preserves a Mk III anti-aircraft Crusader and the Overloon War Museum in the Netherlands owns a gun-tractor variant.

== Gallery ==
Crusader variants
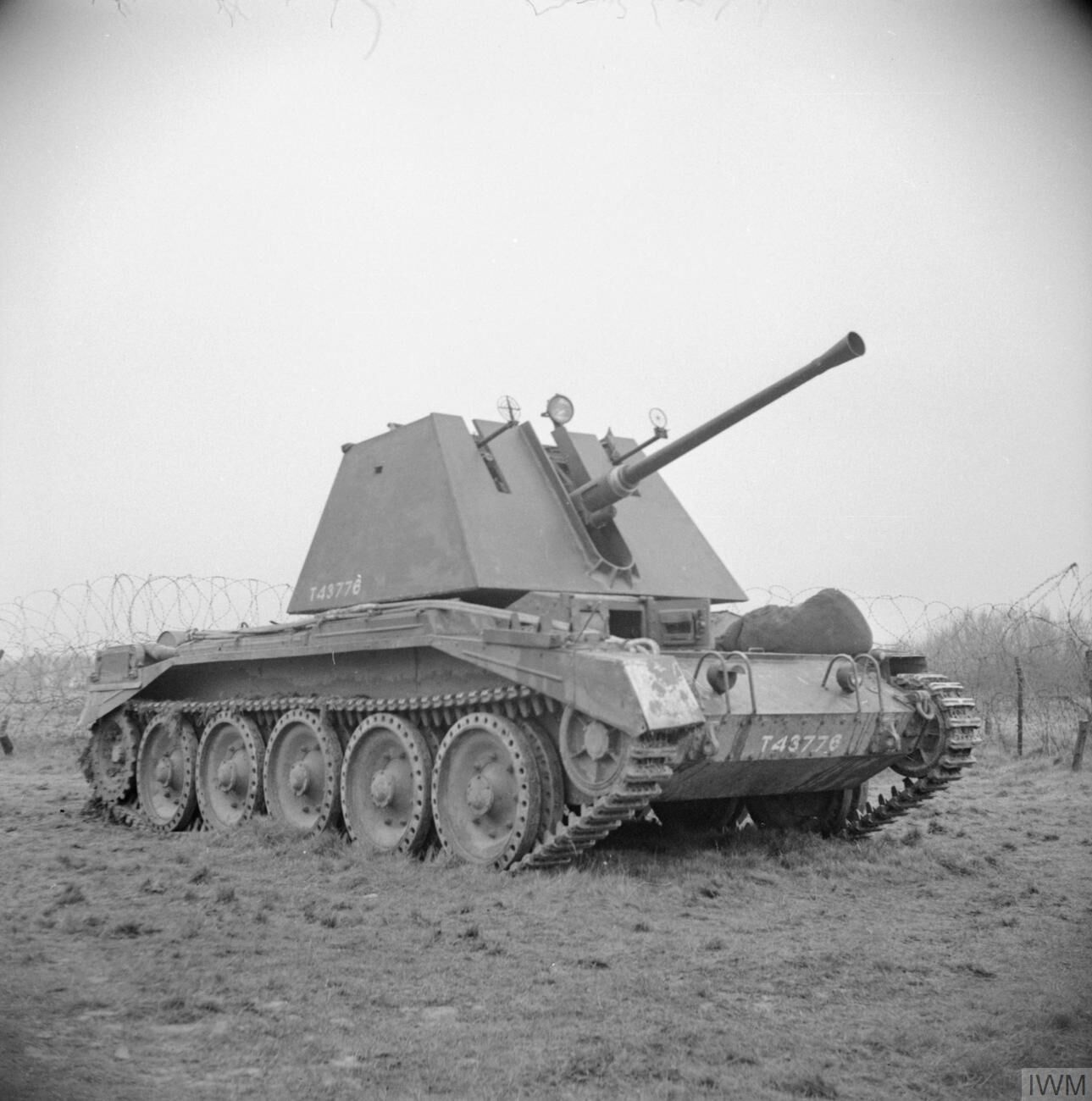
Crusader AA with 40 mm Bofors gun, at the Armoured Fighting Vehicle School, Gunnery Wing at Lulworth in Dorset, 25 March 1943

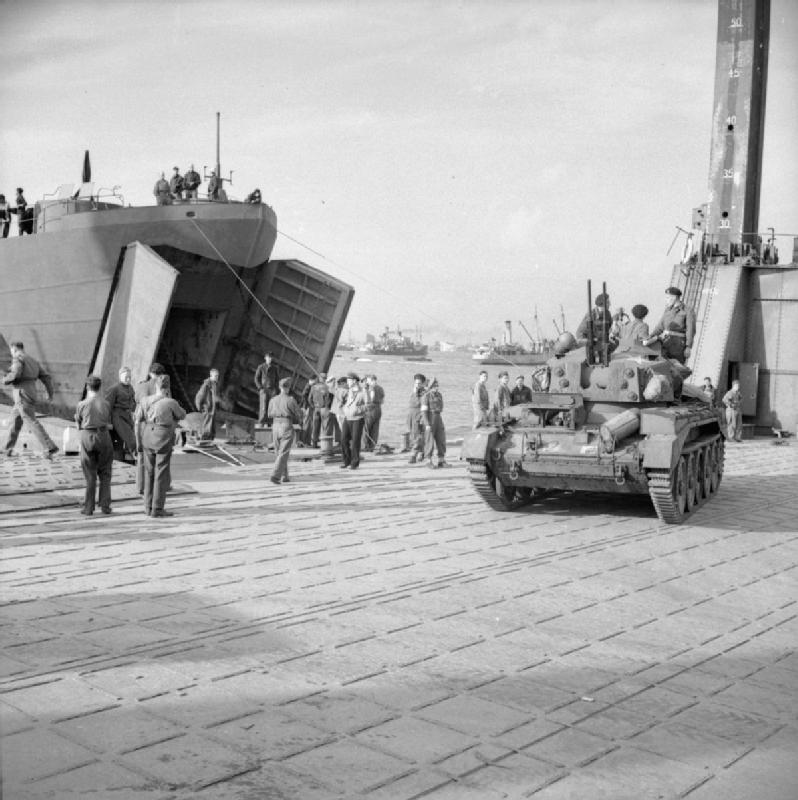
Crusader AA Mk III comes ashore from an LST onto the pierhead at the Mulberry artificial harbour at Arromanches.

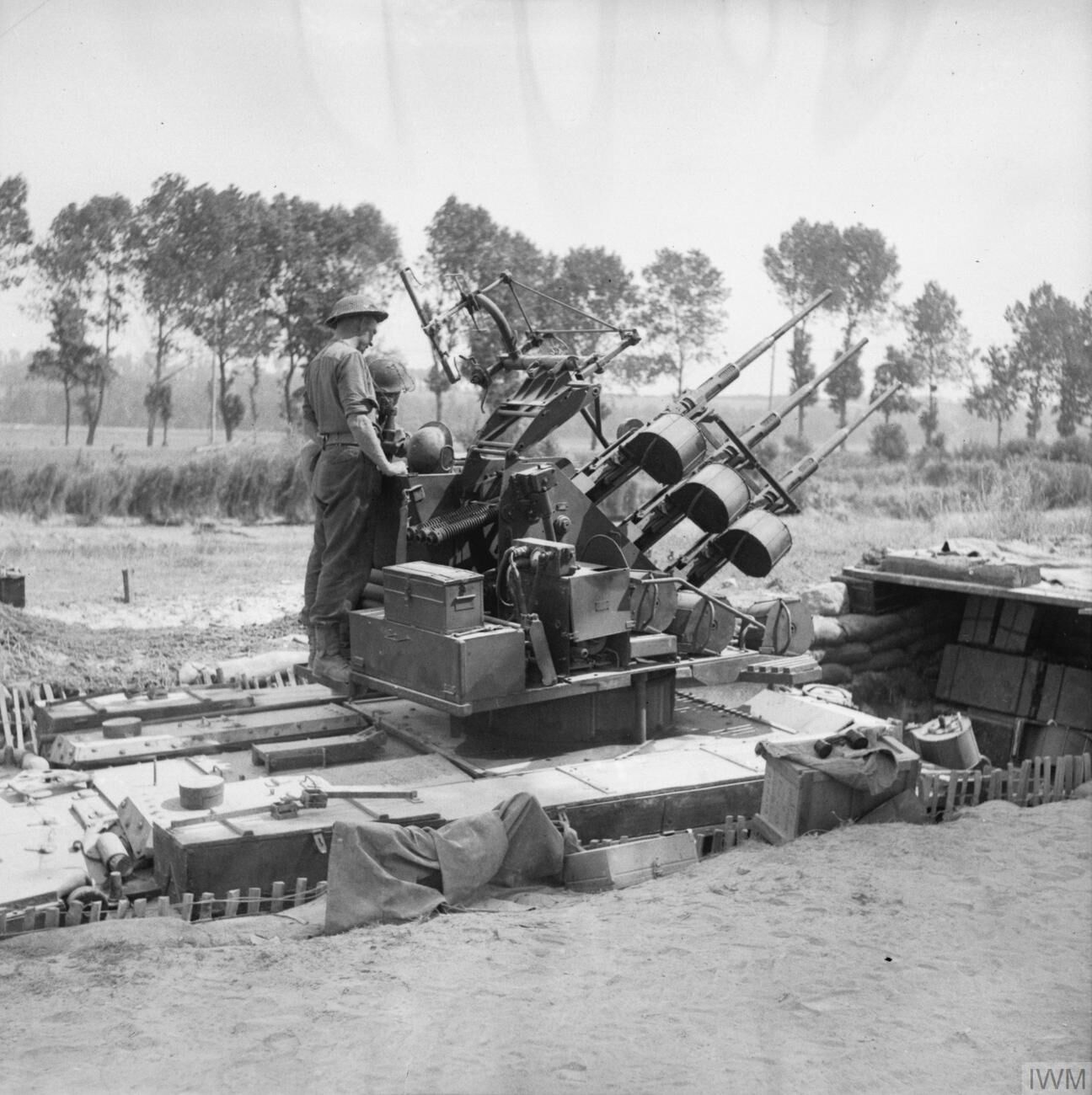
Crusader AA tank variant mounting a triple Oerlikon gun in a hull-down position, 19 July 1944

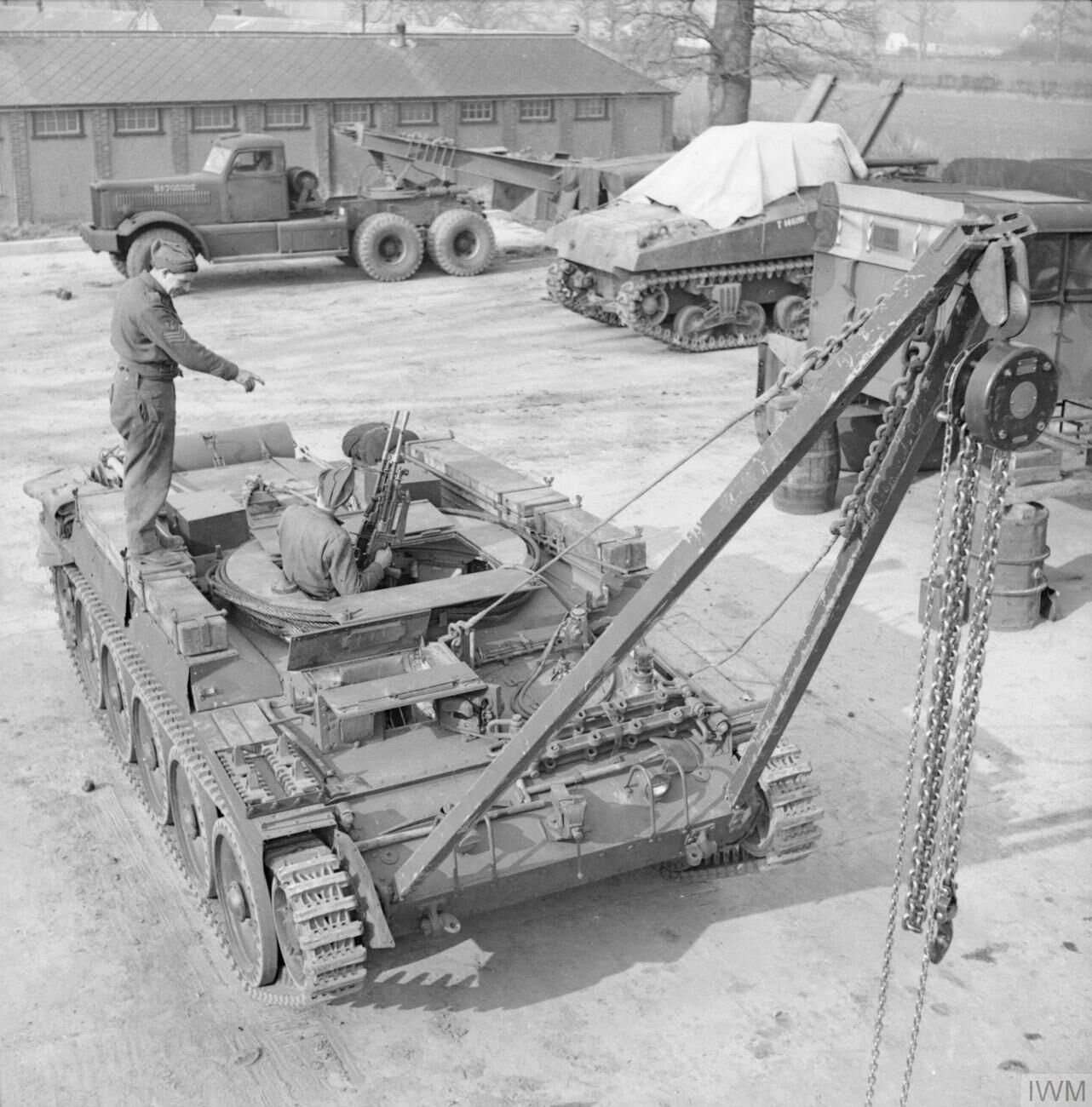
Crusader ARV
