= A-13 (tank) =

Tank specification by the British General Staff Directorate of Tank Design

British Tanks and Armoured Fighting Vehicles 1939–45, Cruiser Mk III (A13)

The A-13 was a specification of British Cruiser tanks produced by the General Staff Directorate of Tank Design before and during the Second World War.

The A13 specification was produced prior to the second world war, calling for the development of a new cruiser tank. This was the first specification of British cruiser tank to be based on the Christie suspension design.

The specification was revised over time, and led to the development of three different vehicles:

- A13 Mark I produced the Cruiser Mk III based on the original specification;
- A13 Mark II produced the Cruiser Mk IV a revision based on up-armouring of the original specification;
- A13 Mark III produced the Covenanter tank based on the final version, a complete reworking of the specification.

== Bibliography ==
- Fletcher, David (2017). British Battle Tanks: British-Made Tanks of World War II. Oxford: Osprey Publishing. ISBN 978-1-4728-2003-7.
