= Nuffield Mechanizations and Aero =

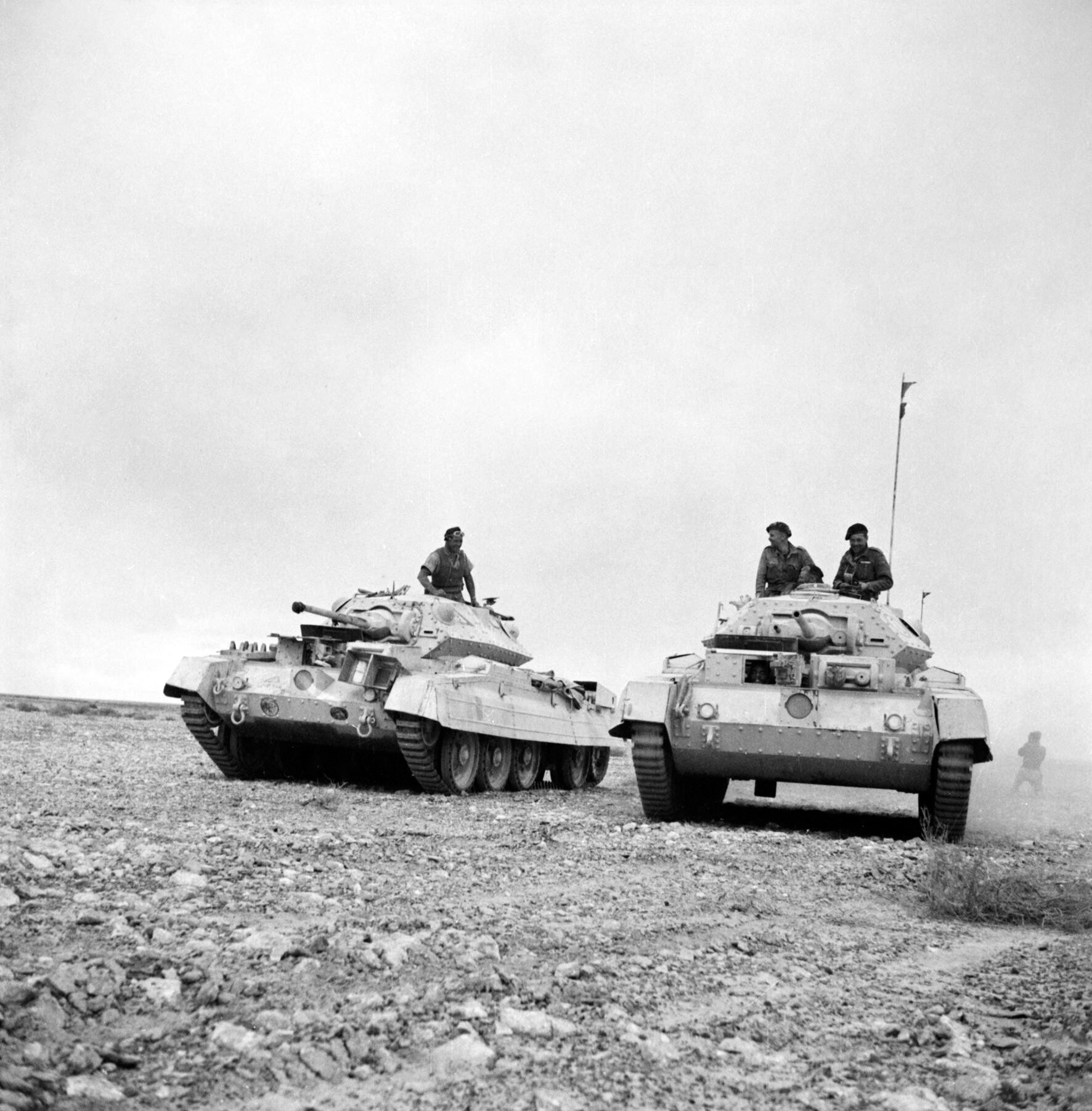
- Crusader tanks built by Nuffield in the Western Desert in November 1941
- Formerly: Wolseley Aero Engines
- Founded: 1935
- Fate: wound up 1953
- Headquarters: Birmingham, England
- Key people: William Morris, 1st Viscount Nuffield
- Products: Tanks

Nuffield Mechanizations and Aero Limited, also known as Mechanizations and Aero Ltd and Nuffield Mechanizations Ltd was William Morris, 1st Viscount Nuffield's personal enterprise developing improved methods for mechanisation and mobility of the British Army and the ground section of the Royal Air Force.

The company was started in 1935 to separate Wolseley Motors aircraft engine manufacturing business from the car business which was joined with Morris Motors vehicle businesses. In 1937 Nuffield Mechanizations Limited was acquired and the combined company was named "Nuffield Mechanizations and Aero Limited".

== Origin ==
Wolseley went bankrupt in 1920s and was bought at auction in 1927 by William Morris, later Viscount Nuffield for £730,000 of his own money. Wolseley had begun aero engine development in 1929 but when Lord Nuffield sold Wolseley Motors to Morris Motors on 1 July 1935, he decided to keep aero engine development quite separate and it remained Lord Nuffield's personal property independent of the Morris Motors group.

The directors of the company were Lord Nuffield as chairman, Oliver Boden, Herbert Clark, Andrew Walsh, and Wilfred Hobbs

In 1935 at the personal request of the Prime Minister, Stanley Baldwin, Lord Nuffield took on the job of bringing up-to-date the mechanization of the Army and the ground section of the Air Force. The result was that the Wolseley Aero Engine plant would manufacture tank engines and that research units were established there to work on new ideas to improve the mechanization and mobility of the Army.

== Aero engines ==
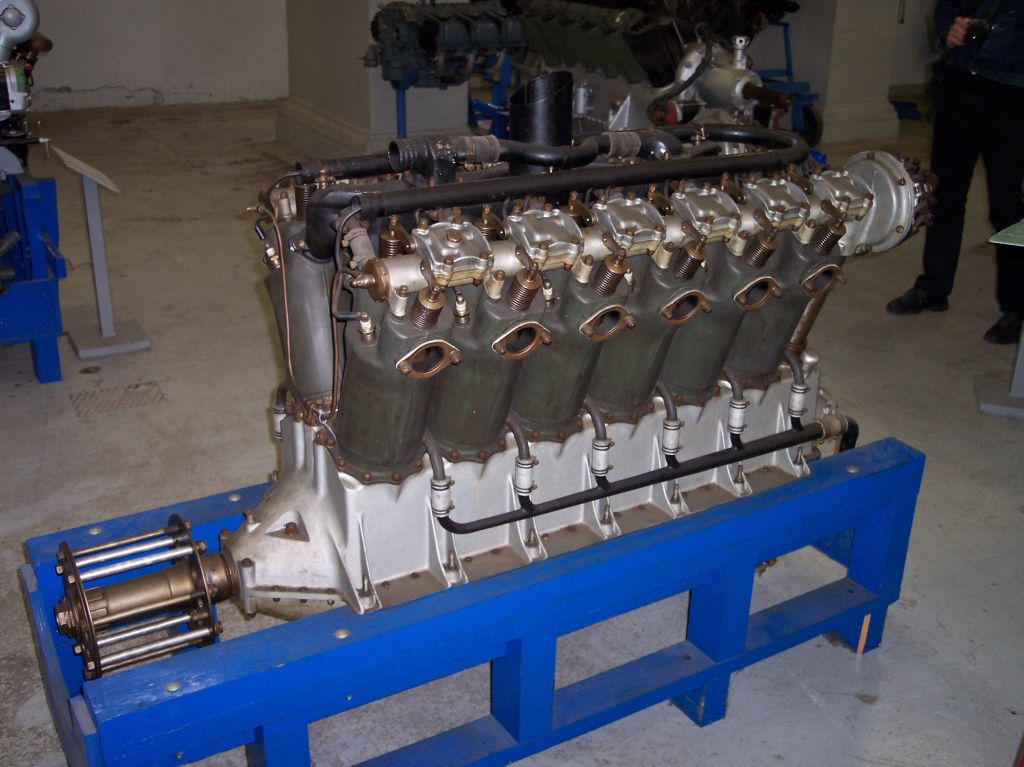
Used from the end of WWI as a tank engine, the 27-litre Liberty L-12 was adapted by Nuffield for their tanks

Nuffield found it difficult to get government interest in him building aero-engines - the ministry saying they did not have enough work to keep the companies they were already using sufficiently busy and could not offer him a contract. When it did come to increased production he would not fit in with the government's plans for a shadow factory scheme where companies would set up new factories producing components which would be assembled at a few locations. He offered to build engines in his existing factory but got no interest. Accordingly in 1936 he notified the Air Ministry he would be closing his aero-engine business. After a personal meeting with the prime minister Wolseley would produce tank engines. Speaking in the parliament, the Secretary of State for Air Lord Swinton said "I can give the House a very firm assurance that Lord Nuffield's great personal capacity, and the great organisation which he has created, will be used to great advantage in the service of the State".

Development and production of Wolseley aero engines was stopped in September 1936. They were developing an advanced Wolseley radial aero engine of about 250 horsepower but the project was abandoned when Lord Nuffield got from the Air Ministry the fixed price Intention to Proceed (ITP) contract papers which he believed would have required "an army of chartered accountants". Lord Nuffield decided he would deal only with the War Office and Admiralty and not the Air Ministry (see Airspeed).

== Tanks ==
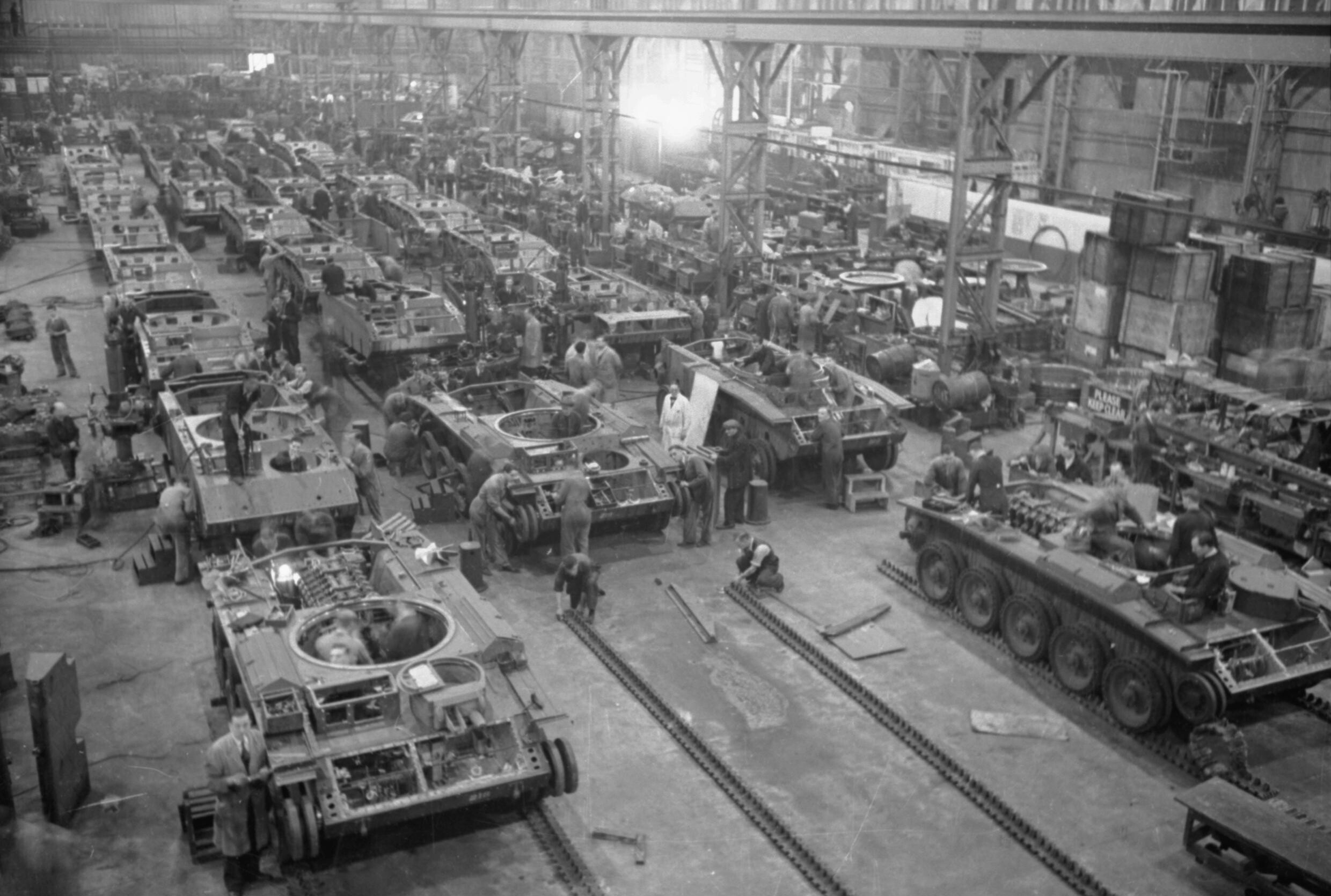
Crusader tank production line in 1941

Nuffield's first tank was the Cruiser Mk III which came out of studies of a Christie-designed tank which was obtained from the USA in 1930s. The first pilot vehicles were delivered in April 1937 and production vehicles, "A13 Mark I" from December 1938. Sixty-five were built by Nuffield. It was developed into the A13 Mk II with more armour - the Cruiser Mk IV - some of which were built by Nuffield with other British manufacturers producing the rest. Nuffield produced Liberty L-12 engines were used in these designs.

To meet a requirement in 1937 for a "heavy", ie better protected, cruiser tank, Nuffield came up with a design based on the Christie suspension and Liberty engine under the General Staff specification "A16". A single prototype, the A16E1, was built but neither it nor the A14 design by London, Midland & Scottish Railway was taken up and the project was cancelled in 1939.

In 1939 the Covenanter tank designed by LMS was ordered and Nuffield were approached about production but choose to develop their own design to meet the same specification using the Liberty and this went into service as the Crusader tank.

While initially effective, in the harsh North Africa campaign the Crusader got a reputation for being unreliable. They were withdrawn from front-line service in 1942; Crusader III saw the introduction of the Mk. IV Liberty engine, fixing many of the reliability issues previously encountered.

Nuffield Mechanizations followed this with the Cavalier tank which also used the Liberty engine. Though the tank was put into production the power of the Liberty engine was limited and because of the increase in tank weight the Cavalier was not used in combat. The last tank the Liberty engine was produced for was the A27L Centaur tank, effectively the same design as the Cromwell tank but with less engine power.

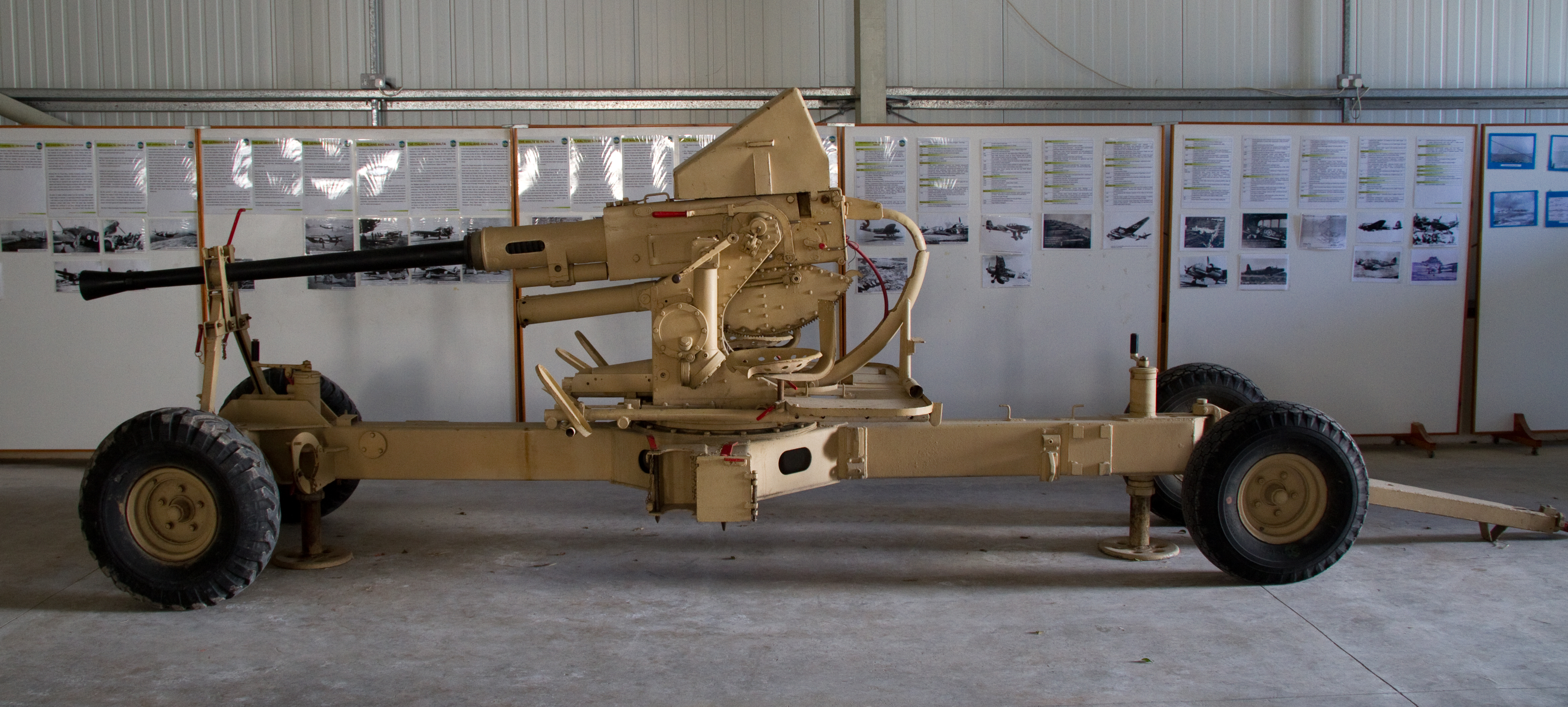
Bofors anti-aircraft gun

== Bofors guns ==
During World War II the Gosford Street, Coventry, plant was to provide over half the UK output of Bofors anti-aircraft guns.

== Locations ==
Nuffield Mechanizations' plants were in Drews Lane, Ward End, Birmingham and Gosford Street Coventry.

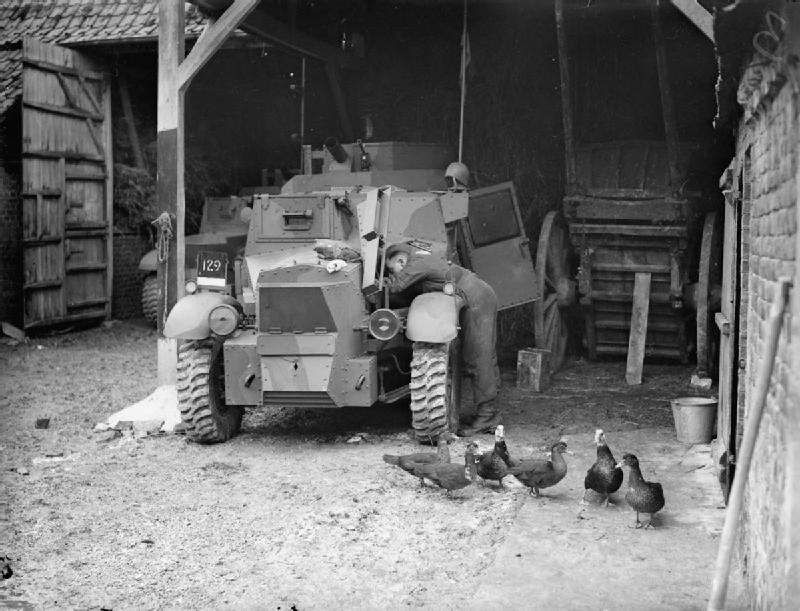
Morris CS9/Light Armoured Car
