= Cruiser Mk IV =

British WWII cruiser tank

Tank, Cruiser, Mk IV (A13 Mk II)
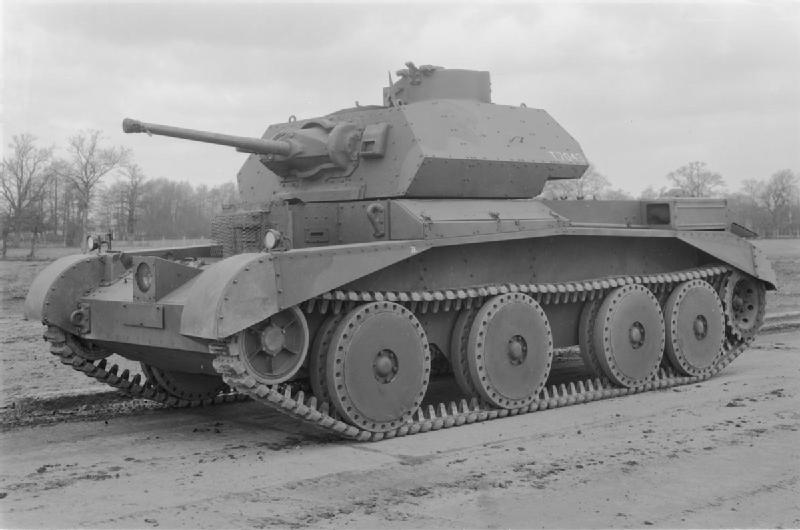
- Type: Cruiser tank
- Place of origin: United Kingdom

Service history
- In service: 1940–1941

Production history
- Produced: 1939–1941
- No. built: 270

Specifications
- Mass: 14.75 long tons (15 t)
- Length: 19 ft 9 in (6.02 m)
- Width: 8 ft 4 in (2.54 m)
- Height: 8 ft 6 in (2.59 m)
- Crew: 4 (commander, gunner, loader, driver)
- Armour: 6–30 mm (0.24–1.18 in)
- Main armament: QF 2-pdr gun 87 rounds
- Secondary armament: 0.303 in Vickers machine gun 3,750 rounds
- Engine: Nuffield Liberty V12 petrol 340 hp (250 kW)
- Suspension: Christie
- Operational range: 90 mi (140 km)
- Maximum speed: 30 mph (48 km/h) off-road: 14 mph (23 km/h)

The Cruiser Tank Mk IV (A13 Mk II) was a British cruiser tank of the Second World War. It followed directly on from the Tank, Cruiser, Mk III (A13 Mk I). The first Mk IVs were Mk IIIs with extra armour fitted to the turret. Later Mk IVAs were built with the complete extra armour. The tank was used in France in 1940 and in the early part of the war in North Africa, before being withdrawn from service. A fast vehicle compared to other British tanks of the early part of the war, it was probably the best cruiser tank Britain had in 1940. In total, 270 of these tanks were built.

== Design and development ==
Britain became interested in fast tanks after observing the Soviet BT tanks during the 1936 Red Army manoeuvres. The BT was based on the revolutionary designs of American J. Walter Christie and a team from Morris Motors was sent to the United States to purchase a Christie tank and the rights to build more. The tank was given the General Staff designation "A13E1" and was delivered in late 1936, but the hull was too small and this led to a second British-built prototype.

The A13E2 was built to mount the turret of the Vickers-designed Cruiser Mk I (A9). This carried a 40 mm Ordnance QF 2-pounder gun and a co-axial .303 water-cooled Vickers machine gun. The drivetrain was also revised, better tracks were used, with rear-mounted drive sprockets and in trials, over 40 miles per hour (64 km/h) was attained on them but later the speed was governed down to 30 miles per hour (48 km/h). The armour of the A13E2 was 15 mm (0.59 in), in line with other pre-war fast tank designs.

The A13E3 was the final trials model, which led to the production tank, A13 MkI, Cruiser Tank Mk III, which entered production in 1939 at Nuffield Mechanizations and Aero, a munitions subsidiary within the Nuffield Organization. An order for 65 tanks was placed and at least 30 tanks completed when the War Office decided to build a new model with thicker armour. The A13 MkII, Cruiser Tank Mk IV, had a maximum armour thickness of 30 mm (1.2 in) and faceted armour was mounted on the original turret sides and rear. This gave the tank a far more modern appearance; some Mk III tanks were re-built to Mk IV standard while at the factory.

The .303 Vickers machine gun gave constant trouble and was replaced by the 7.92 mm BESA machine gun. All British tanks were to have their designs modified to mount the new weapon from early 1940. This led to the main production version, the A13 MkIIA, Cruiser Tank MkIVA. A few examples were sent with the BEF to France, along with most of the earlier A13s. It is not known how many A13 MkIVA tanks were built - the numbers depending on the source. Between the Cruiser Mark III and Cruiser Mark IV, 665 had been built when production ended in 1941. English Electric, Leyland and LMS Railway were also involved in A13 production.

During the Battle of France, the A13 did not perform well, due to poor crew training as a result of being rushed into service. Many tanks shipped to France were in poor condition and some were so new that they had vital parts missing. The A13 performed much better in the deserts of the North Africa campaign and coped with the conditions better than some other designs. It was fast, adequately armed and armoured against Italian and German tanks.The A13 MkII had armour up to 30mm and was armed with an OQF 2 Pounder (40mm) gun wit co-avial .303 Vickers medium machine gun. Powered by a 340 bhp Nuffield Liberty engine it had a maximum road speed of 30 mph (48 km/h). In 1940 the co-axial .303 Vickers was replaced by the 7.92mm Besa, this led to a re-design of the turret face with a new external gun mantlet. This was to be the main production version designated the A13 MkIIA, at least 640 of this type were built 1940-41.

The Nuffield A13 MkIIA equipped the 1st Armoured Division in the UK in 1940, the division also had a few older A9 and A10 in its ranks. Its normal establishment was 45 Heavy Cruiser (2 Pounder) and 24 Cruisers Close Support (3" Howitzer) It was tasked with anti-Invasion duties and as a result was stationed in Southern England. As more tanks became available the A13 MkIIA also equipped the 2nd Armoured Division in late 1940 with the same mix of tanks. This division was preparing for service in North Africa early in1941

The A13 MkIIA remained an effective weapon until late 1941, when newer models of the Panzer III and Panzer IV appeared with thicker armour and larger guns. In North Africa, it was the anti-tank gun that claimed the vast majority of British tanks lost in battle; German tanks accounted for few British losses, contrary to popular belief. The A13 MkIIA, Cruiser MkIV was replaced by two tank designs, the Cruiser MkV Covenanter tank and the A15 Crusader tank. The A13 Covenanter was a radical departure from the original A13 design and constituted an entirely new tank, though design flaws meant it was unsuitable for warfare and it was used only for training. The A15 Crusader used the same Liberty engine but in all other respects was a new design.

== Production history and variants ==
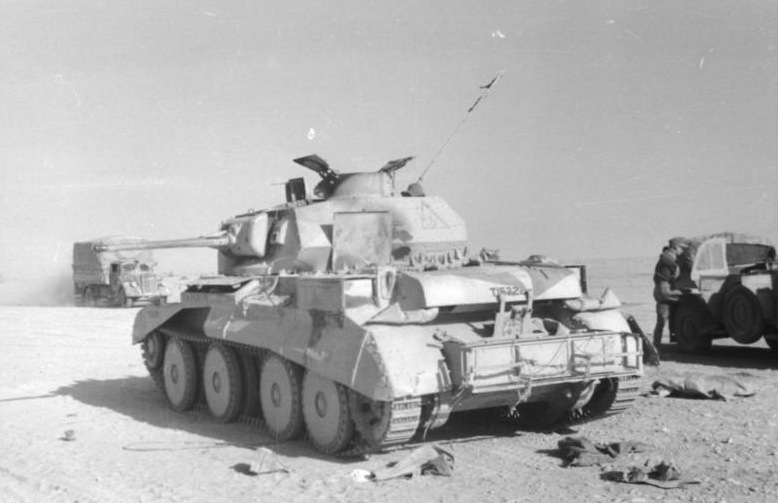
A Cruiser Mk IV tank destroyed in the North African Campaign

Sixty-five Mk III were built in 1939 by Nuffield; some of these were converted to Mk IV

	Pre-war	Sep-Dec 1939	1940	1941
Cruiser, Mk. IV (A.13 Mk. II)	—	8	89	—
Cruiser, Mk. IVA (A.13 Mk. IIA)	—	—	169	6

- MkIV CS, not built
- MkV, re-design by LMS Railway as Cruiser Tank Mk V Covenanter (general staff specification A13 Mark III)

Mk IVA (AC Mk IIA)

The .303 Vickers machine gun was replaced with 7.92-millimetre (0.312 in) Besa machine gun. The MkIVA featured a new gun mantlet and was built at several factories, including LMS Railway. It was the main type used in the desert from 1940 to 1942.

== Combat history ==
Approximately 40 Cruiser Mk IV and MkIVA, saw service in France in 1940 with the 1st Armoured Division of the British Expeditionary Force. Most were abandoned at Calais, and the few tanks that did see action were destroyed by the numerically superior German armoured forces.

From October 1940, MkIVA cruisers were sent to the war in North Africa, where it was used with the older A9, Cruiser Tank MkI and A10 Cruiser Tank MkII. The A13 was never available in sufficient numbers and a typical armoured brigade would have a mixture of relatively slow 10–20 mph (16–32 km/h) Mk I and Mk II cruisers with faster 30–40 mph (48–64 km/h) Mark IVs and Light Tank Mk VI (the latter acting as cruiser tanks), this caused tactical and supply difficulties.

Nine Mark IV tanks captured by the Germans after the Battle of France were reused as command vehicles for Panzer Abteilung (Flamm) 100 ("Flame tank battalion 100") during Operation Barbarossa. They were given the German designations Pz.Kpf.Wg.A13(e) or MK IV 744(e); the 'e' signifying their origin as 'English'.
