= Cavalier tank =

British WWII cruiser tank

Tank, Cruiser, Mk VII Cavalier (A24)
- Type: Cruiser tank
- Place of origin: United Kingdom

Service history
- In service: 1942–1945
- Used by: United Kingdom, Free France
- Wars: Second World War

Production history
- Designer: Nuffield Mechanization & Aero Limited
- Designed: 1941
- Manufacturer: Nuffield Mechanization & Aero Limited
- Produced: 1942
- No. built: 500

Specifications
- Mass: 27 long tons (27 tonnes)
- Length: 20 ft 10 in (6.35 m)
- Width: 9 ft 6 in (2.90 m)
- Height: 8 ft (2.44 m)
- Crew: 5 (Commander, gunner, loader, driver, co-driver)
- Armour: 20–76 mm (0.79–2.99 in)
- Main armament: QF 6 pounder, 64 rounds
- Secondary armament: 2 x 7.92 mm Besa machine gun, 4,950 rounds
- Engine: Nuffield Liberty petrol 410 horsepower (310 kW)
- Power/weight: 14.9 hp (11.2 kW) / tonne
- Suspension: Improved Christie
- Operational range: 165 miles (266 km)
- Maximum speed: 24 mph (39 km/h) off-road 14 mph (23 km/h)

The Tank, Cruiser, Mk VII Cavalier (A24) was an interim design of British cruiser tank during the Second World War.

It was derived as a follow on from the Nuffield's A15 Crusader tank as it was expected to enter production in 1942. A parallel effort under Leyland Motors and Birmingham Railway Carriage and Wagon Company to the same specification resulted in the A27 Cromwell and Centaur tanks which was accepted for service in preference to the Cavalier.

== Development ==
=== Early development ===
Development of the Cavalier initially started as development of the Cromwell tank. In mid-1940, the British were considering which tank should follow on from the new cruiser tanks then being developed. A specification was drawn up by the Directorate of Tanks and Transport which included the 57 mm QF 6 pounder gun. This led to General Staff specification A23 for a cruiser version of the A22 Churchill tank from Vauxhall, and A24 from Nuffield Mechanization & Aero Limited based upon their Crusader tank design. Birmingham Railway Carriage and Wagon Company (BRC&W) also submitted a design based on the Crusader.

The Nuffield design used an uprated -410 hp (310 kW)- Liberty engine which was expected to give a top speed of 24 mph (39 km/h). Armour would be from 63 to 70 mm (2.5 to 2.8 in) at the front, and the 6 pounder gun would be in a turret on a 60-inch (1.5 m) turret ring.

The Tank Board meeting in January 1941 decided that as the tank needed to be in production by early 1942 it should be based upon an existing design to avoid the need for prototypes. Six tanks of the A24 Nuffield design were ordered that month, and the tank was given the name "Cromwell".

=== Separation from Cromwell ===
Rolls-Royce's design team, working with Leyland's engineers, produced the Meteor engine from their Merlin aero-engine. This gave a higher output than the Liberty for a similar size. Initially intended to be fitted to the A24, the new engine was not acceptable to Nuffield.

Working with Rolls-Royce and Leyland, BRC&W were able to produce a prototype of their version of the Cromwell design using the Meteor. This spawned a new specification for Cromwell, A27, using a new Leyland transmission. Leyland later had doubts about the Meteor and wanted to manufacture the Liberty instead, splitting the Cromwell programme further into A24, A27L, and A27M (the latter two denoting Liberty and Meteor engines)

The General staff specifications now covered three tanks: A24 "Cromwell I" from Nuffield, A27L (Liberty engine) "Cromwell II" from Leyland and A27M (Meteor engine) "Cromwell III".

To avoid confusion Cromwell I was renamed "Cavalier". The Cromwell II become "Centaur" and the Cromwell III remained as the "Cromwell".

Production and design efforts separated from A27, and Cavalier became a separate tank.

== Production ==
At the end of 1941, it was decided production of the Nuffield design would be by Nuffield and Ruston and Hornsby. The schedule had already slipped due to work on other projects and work to fit the 6-pounder to the Crusader tank. The first tank began trials in March 1942. Production versions of the Cromwell delivered first, and provided greater performance than the Cavalier. Cavalier was judged unsatisfactory and the Nuffield order was reduced to 500 tanks. It never entered front-line service.

== Design ==
Internally, the Cavalier was subdivided by bulkheads, which also functioned as structural members. The driver and hull gunner were in the front compartment, the fighting compartment was in the centre. The bulkhead behind the fighting compartment was the firewall from the engine, a Liberty Mark IV, and the final bulkhead separated the engine from the transmission.

Mechanically, the Cavalier was similar to the preceding Crusader tank, using Wilson steering and the Liberty engine. The newer Liberty Mark IV gave more power than the one in the Crusader. The operation of the steering brakes and gear changing remained pneumatic.

Outwardly, the design of Cavalier is very similar to the related Cromwell and Centaur. Cavaliers do not have the upper air intake of Cromwell, which is optional on the Centaur. Cavalier has shorter suspension arms. Cavaliers were built with hull types A and B. Exhaust exits through the hull rear plate using Crusader style angled louvres, where Cromwell and Centaur both exhaust to the vehicle top.

The Cavalier turret was a six sided boxy structure. The mantlet was internal with a large opening in the front of the turret for the gun barrel, the coaxial Besa machine gun and the aperture of the No. 39 telescopic sight. The gun was of the "free elevation" type; the gun was balanced such that it could be readily moved by the gunner. This fitted with British practice of firing on the move.

== Service history ==
Those that were built were used in training or auxiliary armoured vehicle roles. At least 12 Cavaliers were provided to France in 1945, and were operated by the 12th Dragoon Regiment of the French 14th Infantry Division and the 13th Dragoon Regiment of the 3rd Armored Division also armed with French B1 Bis tanks.

== Variants ==
Cavalier OP
Produced in 1943. The gun was replaced with a dummy barrel freeing up room in the turret and hull for extra radios. It was then used as an artillery observation post.

Cavalier ARV
The turret was removed and an A-frame jib and associated equipment added for use as an armoured recovery vehicle.

== Surviving vehicles ==
Only two vehicles are thought to have survived.

- The Tank Museum, Dorset, England. Cavalier (A24), formerly on Larkhill artillery ranges. which is in a bad condition and in storage (outside) awaiting restoration.
- – Lance Varga Collection, USA. Cavalier (A24)

== Sources ==
- Fletcher, David (1989a). The Great Tank Scandal: British Armour in the Second World War - Part 1. HMSO. ISBN 978-0-11-290460-1.
- Fletcher, David; Harley, Richard C. (2006). Cromwell Cruiser tank 1942-50. New Vanguard 104. illustrated by Peter Sarson. Oxford: Osprey Publishing. ISBN 9781841768144. OCLC 56539945.
