= Cruiser Mk III =

British WWII cruiser tank

Cruiser Mark III
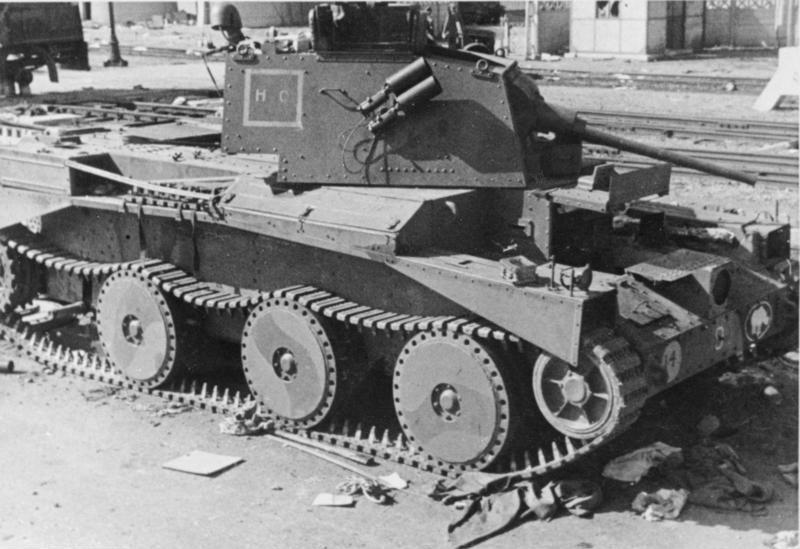
- Abandoned Cruiser Mark III in Calais, France
- Type: Cruiser tank
- Place of origin: United Kingdom

Service history
- In service: 1938–1941
- Used by: British Army
- Wars: Second World War

Production history
- Designer: Morris Commercial Cars
- Designed: 1936–1937
- Manufacturer: Nuffield Mechanisations & Aero, Limited
- Unit cost: £12,000
- Produced: 1938-1939
- No. built: 65

Specifications
- Mass: 14 Long tons (14.2 tonnes)
- Length: 19 ft 8 in (6.0 m)
- Width: 8 ft 4 in (2.54 m)
- Height: 8 ft 6 in (2.59 m)
- Crew: 4 (commander, gunner, loader, driver)
- Armour: 6–14 mm
- Main armament: QF 2-pounder gun; 87 rounds
- Secondary armament: .303 Vickers machine gun; 3,750 rounds
- Engine: Nuffield Liberty V12 petrol 340 hp (250 kW)
- Suspension: Christie
- Operational range: 90 mi (140 km)
- Maximum speed: Road: 50 km/h (31 mph) Off-road: 30 mph (48 km/h)

The Tank, Cruiser, Mk III, also known by its General Staff specification number A13 Mark I, was a British cruiser tank of the Second World War. It was the first British cruiser tank to use the Christie suspension system, which gave higher speeds and better cross-country performance; previous cruiser tank models had used triple wheeled bogie suspension.

== Design and development ==
British cruiser tank design began with the Cruiser Mk I and somewhat heavier Cruiser Mk II in the mid-1930s. Just as prototypes were arriving in 1936, General Giffard LeQuesne Martel, a pioneer in tank design who had published works on armoured warfare and pioneered the lightly armoured "tankette" to enhance infantry mobility, became Assistant Director of Mechanisation at the War Office.

In September 1936, Martel witnessed demonstrations of Soviet tank designs, including the BT tank, which had been influenced by American J. Walter Christie's work. Martel urged the adoption of the Christie suspension and Christie's practice of using a lightweight aircraft engine, such as the Liberty Engine. The government authorised the purchase and licensing of a Christie design via the Nuffield Organization, rather than contact the Soviet authorities.

The vehicle obtained seems, on close examination of photographs not to be Christie's prototype M1931 but a production "T3 Medium", the US Army having decided to replace this model c. 1934. Why this survivor was sent to Britain is unknown, though it is possible it was the only available example, hastily put into operable condition but minus its turret. On arrival it was given British War Department number T2086, the road registration BMX841 and the Mechanical Experimentation Establishment's experimental number 958. After trials it was sent to Morris Commercial Cars Ltd, Birmingham and dismantled for study, Lord Nuffield (head of the Morris companies) had already agreed to buy the patent rights that would allow his company to develop the design that would become the basis of the Cruiser Mk III (A13), extensively redesigned, enlarged and with several faults that Christie had not addressed rectified. A new company Nuffield Mechanisation & Aero Limited was formed for the development and production of the design.

At a meeting of the General Staff, an official specification was determined, which included 30 mm (1.2 in) armour, a Ordnance QF 2-pounder gun and a road speed of 30 miles per hour (48 km/h). A subsequent review of the specification by Martel and Percy Hobart approved 30 mm armour all round, provided cross-country speed could be kept at 25 miles per hour (40 km/h). Pending the delivery of the A13, an interim design was approved from the A7, A9 and A10, the A9 being selected. Orders for the resulting Mk. I's were limited pending the arrival of the A13.

The Mk III proved to be much faster than its predecessor, the Mk I, with a more than double power-to-weight ratio. It also had the same turret as the Mk I and Mk II Cruiser tanks. However, it still was not very well armoured, having the same maximum of 14mm of armour. An up-armoured variant of the Mk III would be made and designated Cruiser Mk IV and would become the successor of the Mk III.

The first prototype (A13E1) was delivered in 1937. Following the testing of two prototypes, the A13 was ordered into production. The original order was for 50 tanks; 43 had been delivered by the start of the war and 22 more from September to December 1939. The Mk III weighed 14 long tons (14 t), had a crew of four, a 340 horsepower (250 kW) engine and a top speed of 30 miles per hour (48 km/h) and was armed with a 2 pounder gun and a machine-gun. When it was introduced into service in 1937, the army still lacked a formal tank division.

== Combat history ==
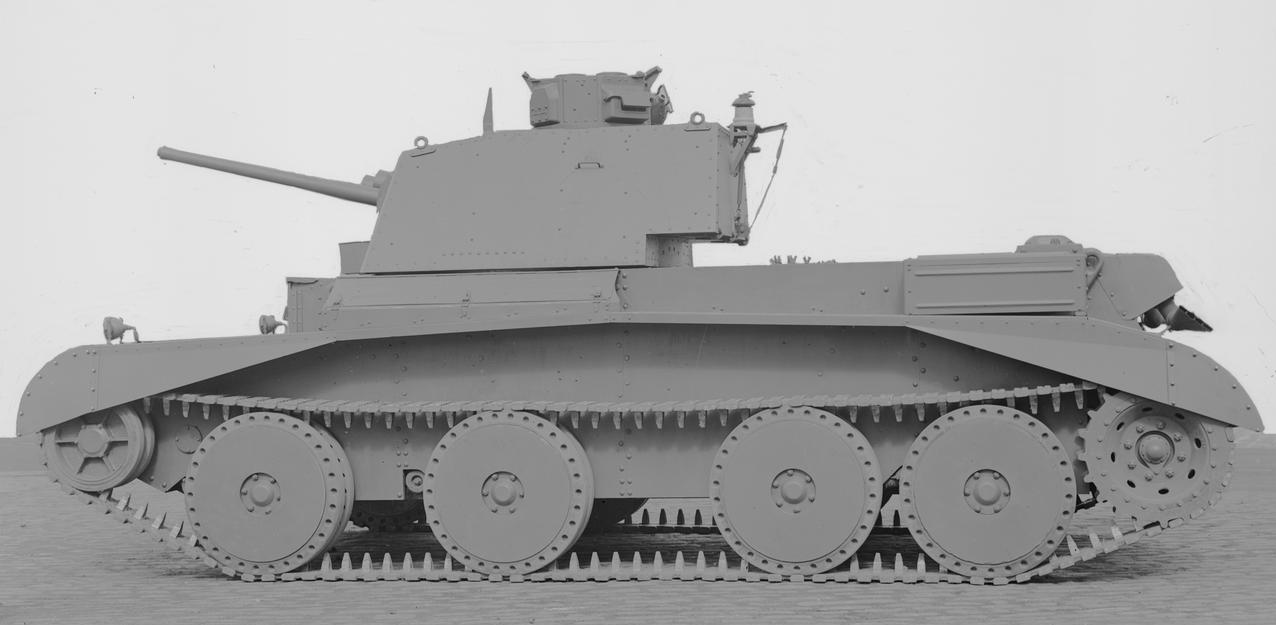
Tank, Cruiser, Mk III (A13 Mk I)

Like most early British cruisers, the A13 was fast but under-armoured and mechanically unreliable. As part of the British Expeditionary Force sent to France, the Cruiser Mark III equipped units in the 1st Armoured Division but most were lost. A few were used in the Battle of Greece and in the Western Desert 1940–1941, where they equipped units of the 7th Armoured Division. The design was used as the basis for the Cruiser Mk IV.

== See also ==
- Cruiser tank
- Cruiser Mk. IV
- BT Tank
