= Christie M1931 =

Christie M1931 T1 Combat Car T3 Medium Tank
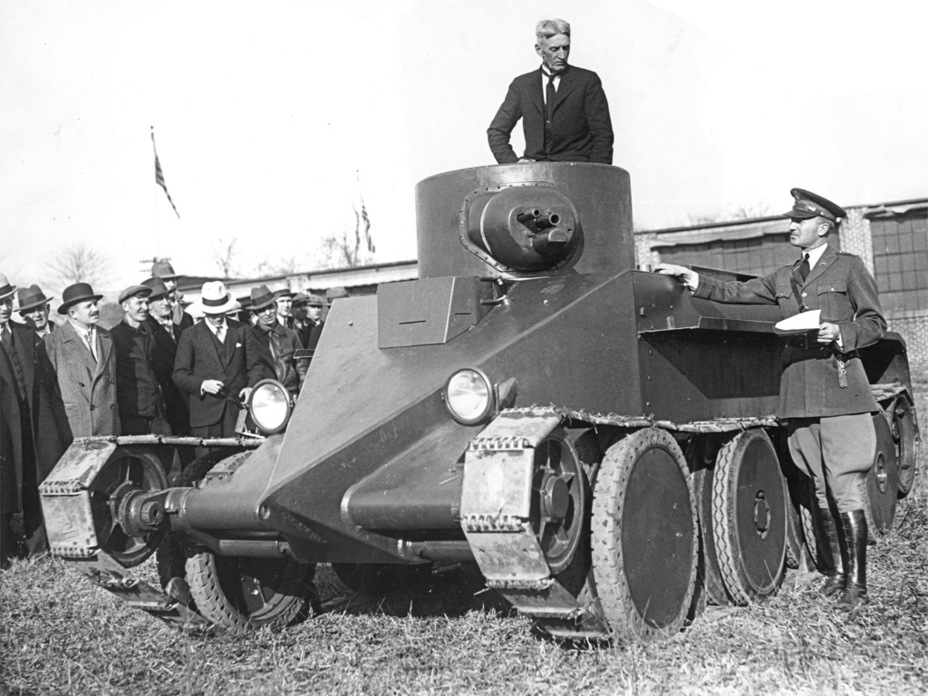
- Christie M.1931 during a demonstration, with Christie himself standing in the turret
- Type: Medium tank/Light tank
- Place of origin: United States

Service history
- In service: 1932–1936
- Used by: United States

Production history
- Designer: J. Walter Christie (US Wheel Track Layer Corporation)
- Designed: 1930
- Manufacturer: US Wheel Track Layer Corporation
- Unit cost: $34,500 (without armament, turret, engine, muffler or radio)
- Produced: 1930–1931
- No. built: 9

Specifications
- Mass: 22,220 lb (10 tonnes) combat weight
- Length: 5.55 m (18 ft 3 in)
- Width: 2.23 m (7 ft 4 in)
- Height: 2.28 m (7 ft 6 in)
- Crew: 2 (Gunner, driver)
- Armor: 5/8 in (16 mm) maximum (Note: on hull front)
- Main armament: 37mm M1916 (T3 Medium); 0.50 in (12.7 mm) M2 Browning machine gun (T1 Combat Car)
- Secondary armament: .30 in (7.62 mm) M1919A4 Browning machine gun
- Engine: Liberty L-12 12-cylinder gasoline engine 449 hp (335 kW) at 2,000 rpm
- Suspension: Christie suspension
- Maximum speed: 40 mph (64 km/h) on wheels 25 mph (40 km/h) on tracks

The Christie M1931, known as the Combat Car, T1 in US Cavalry use and Medium/Light Tank, Convertible, T3 in Infantry branch, was a wheel-to-track tank designed by J. Walter Christie for the United States Army using Christie's ideas of an aero-engine and the novel Christie suspension to give high mobility.

The M1931 was Christie's first tank to be accepted for production by the US Army and was used briefly by experimental tank units. Christie's design had more influence in Europe, with the USSR and the UK developing Christie's ideas in the form of Bystrokhodny (fast) tanks and cruiser tanks respectively.

== Development ==
The Christie M1931 originated as the M1928, which used Christie's suspension, and had the ability to run on its tracks or the wheels. The M1928 was demonstrated unofficially to the US Army by traversing a route at an average speed of 45 km/h (28 mph); by contrast the US Army's T1E1 tanks – expected to replace their WWI-era M1917 light tanks – averaged 16 km/h (9.9 mph) over the same route. This prompted sufficient interest to properly consider Christie's ideas.

In 1930, after protracted negotiations, a contract was signed with Christie's US Wheel Track Layer Corporation to build an improved version of the M1928 at a cost of $55,000.

The prototype M1931, without armament, was delivered in March 1931. An order for seven more was placed in June; these were delivered by 1932. Officially called the "Convertible Medium Tank T3", three went to Company F, 67th Infantry (Medium Tanks) at Fort Benning. The remaining four were passed to the 1st Cavalry Regiment (Mechanized) at Fort Knox. With the gun replaced by a heavy machine gun, they were renamed "Combat Car T1". (Note: The Cavalry were not allowed - by the National Defense Act of 1920 - to possess "tanks" which were defined as limited to the Infantry, so the renaming was a way to circumvent the prohibition) The prototype was returned to Christie.

== See also ==
- Tanks of the interwar period
- Tanks of the United States
