= Christie suspension =

Suspension system used in early tanks

The Christie suspension is the name of a suspension system developed by American engineer J. Walter Christie (1865–1944) for military vehicles, especially tanks. This system allowed for considerably longer movement than the leaf spring system, which was commonly used at the time. Aside from faster maneuverability, the Christie suspension used individual road wheels with tyres that allowed a tank to be used without treads.

== History ==
J. Walter Christie, an American engineer and inventor, envisioned a lightweight tank with long range capabilities and high speed that were designed to penetrate enemy lines and attack their infrastructure and logistics. His first prototype of 1919 could be driven on its wheels to get to the desired point and have its tracks quickly fitted on at its destination. This prototype, designated as the Christie Model M1919, was delivered to the U.S. Army for testing, which was then approved on 8 June 1920. Christie later proposed another modification to add coil suspension to the front wheels of the tank and removed the turret, relocating it to the nose of the tank. The modified tank, designed M1921, debuted in 1922 but was rejected this time as it was deemed unsafe and unreliable due to lacking in maneuverability and internal space.

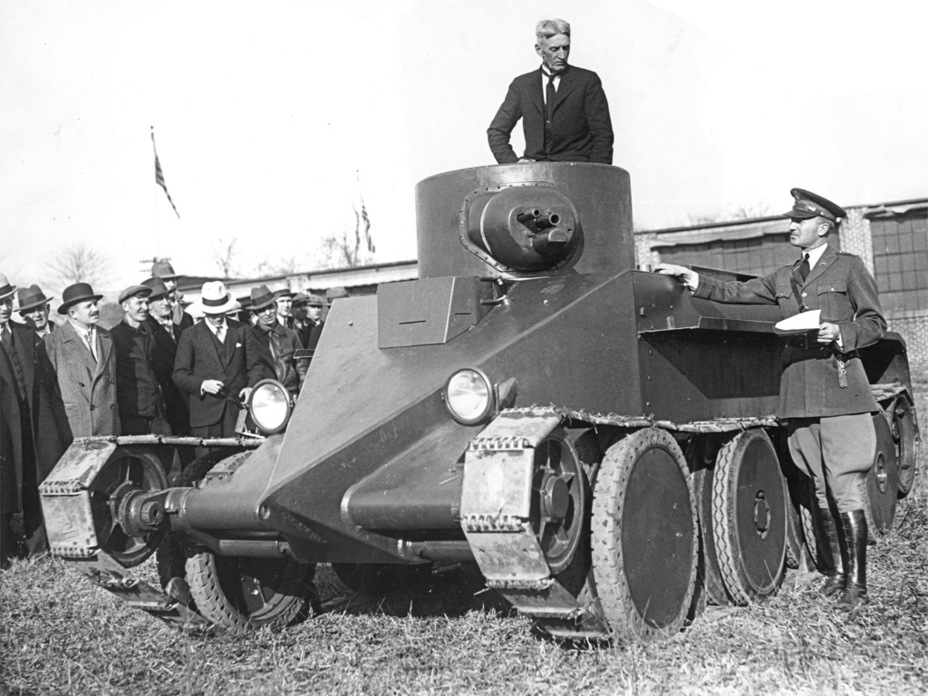
Demonstration of the M1931 in front of the factory at Rahway

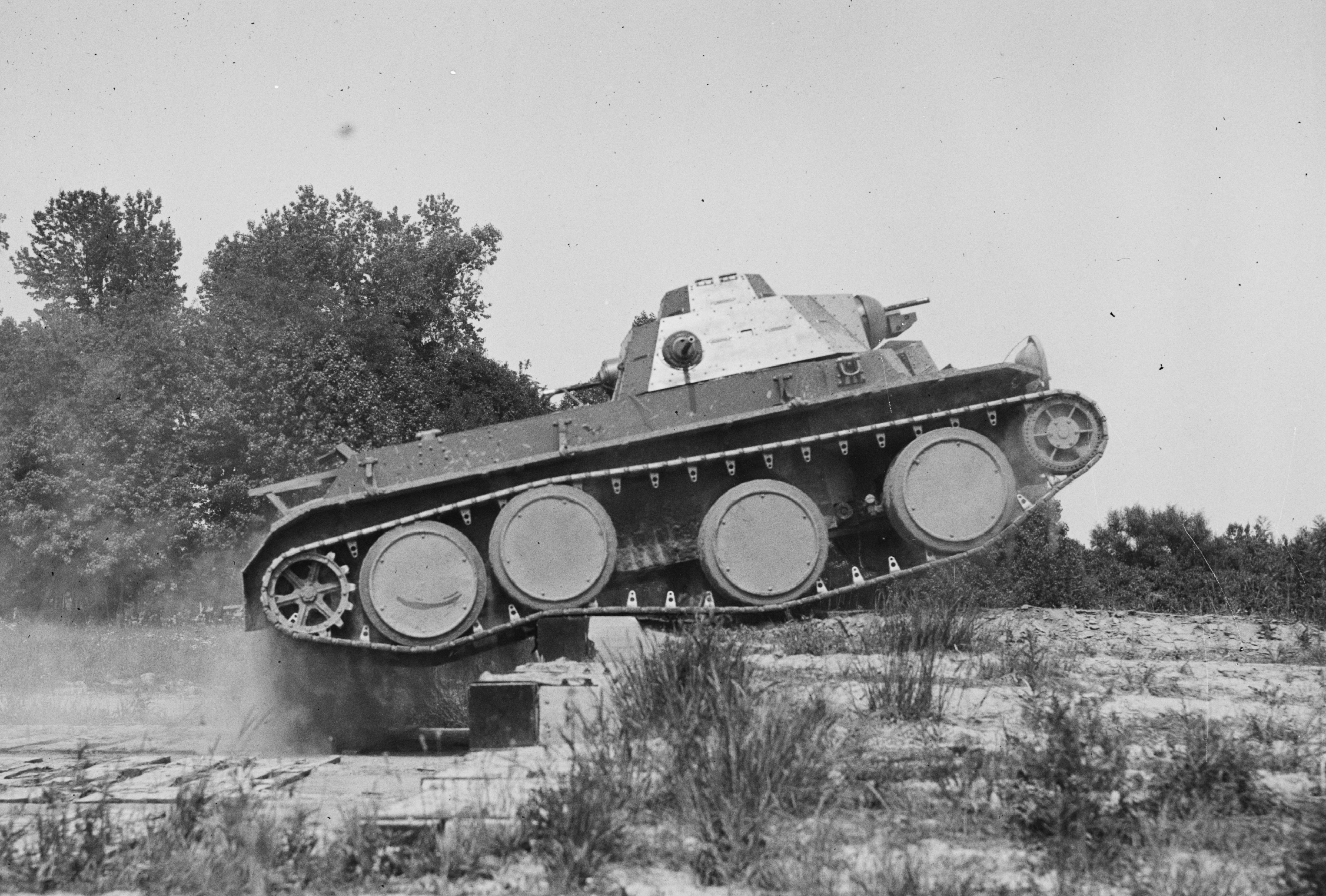
A T3E2 tank with Christie suspension system crossing an obstacle during tests in 1936.

In the late 1920s, Christie modified his suspension system to add a bellcrank that could change the direction of motion from vertical to horizontal. The road wheels were individually mounted on a pipe that could move vertically only, at the top of which the bell crank rotated the direction of motion to the rear. Springs were mounted on the end of the crank, and could be as long as needed, lying along the inside of the hull. Using this new suspension, Christie designed the M1928. Unlike his previous designs, it used identical wheels for all except the sprocket and idler and the center wheels didn't have to be elevated to enable road travel. The suspension used large helical springs, mounted inside the armored compartment to provide a much smoother ride than leaf-spring suspensions while sacrificing space inside the tank. Christie later modified the M1928 to create the improved tank.

The U.S. Army took an interest in this modified prototype, ordering one in March 1931, and later ordering seven more models in June of that year. These tanks, known as the Christie M1931, were designated as Convertible Medium Tank T3, with four given to the cavalry for testing. It was declared that the tank's light armour was insufficient for the infantry support function the tank was expected to have, which led to U.S. Army to reject the prototypes. Even though the U.S. Army had afterwards drawn up a specification for improvements on these prototypes, these new specifications were eventually sold to the America-La France company for production of American tanks.

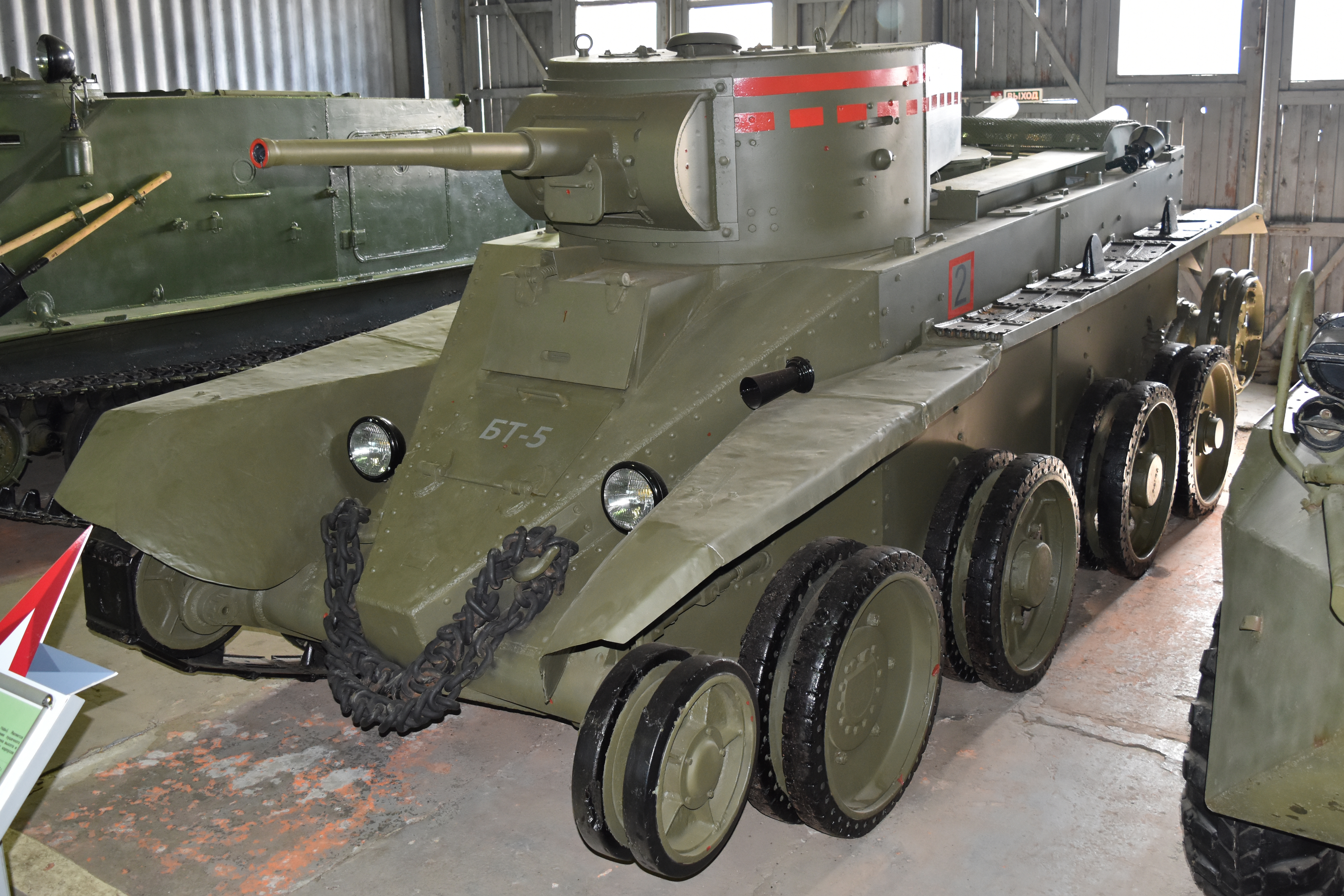
A BT-5 light tank without treads. Tanks that used the Christie suspension system were generally able to operate with or without treads.

Christie was fond of publicity stunts and to promote his M1928, he made a fast road trip from Fort Meade, Maryland to Gettysburg, Pennsylvania with an average speed of 28mph. This attracted two potential customers, the Polish Army which inspected the tank in 1929 and the USSR. A Red Army commission sent to tour tank manufacturers to purchase modern tank designs arrived at Christie's corporation on April 10, 1930. After inspecting the tank, the commission was so impressed that they telegraphed Moscow to cancel the order for T1E2 tanks in favor of the M1928. On April 28, 1930 Christie signed a contract to provide two M1928s to the Soviet Union for $60,000 and later gave over all associated patents and license production rights for $100,000.

The Christie suspension system entered Soviet hands in 1930, when Christie himself sold two prototype tanks to the Amtorg Trading Corporation without the prior approval of the U.S. Army or the Department of State. These prototype tanks were labelled as "agricultural tractors" during the sale, and were shipped turretless to the USSR. The Soviets inspected and reverse engineered Christie's prototypes, leading to the creation of the BT series of light tanks. The Soviet T-34 medium tank carried over the Christie suspension system from the BT series. While attempts were made to replace the T-34's Christie suspension with torsion bar suspension on the T-34M and T-43 prototypes, combat experience against improved German tanks prompted the State Defense Committee to give priority to upgunning the existing T-34, leading to the adoption of the T-34-85 in place of the T-43. The contemporary KV and IS tank series employed torsion bar suspension, which also became standard on later Soviet tank generations beginning with the T-44.

The suspension system was also used by the British Army in their tanks. The British War Office, upon hearing of favourable reports on observation of Soviet war activities, arranged a purchase of the last of Christie's prototypes. Like the earlier deal with the Soviets, the prototype tank was labelled as a farm tractor and shipped to Britain, with other parts that had to be dismantled being shipped under the label "fruits". The British Army reverse engineered and reworked Christie's prototype, leading to the introduction of the Cruiser Mk III, the first British tank to use the Christie suspension system. The Comet medium tank of 1944 was the last British tank to use such a system, as after World War II, the system was scrapped in favour of the Horstmann suspension system.

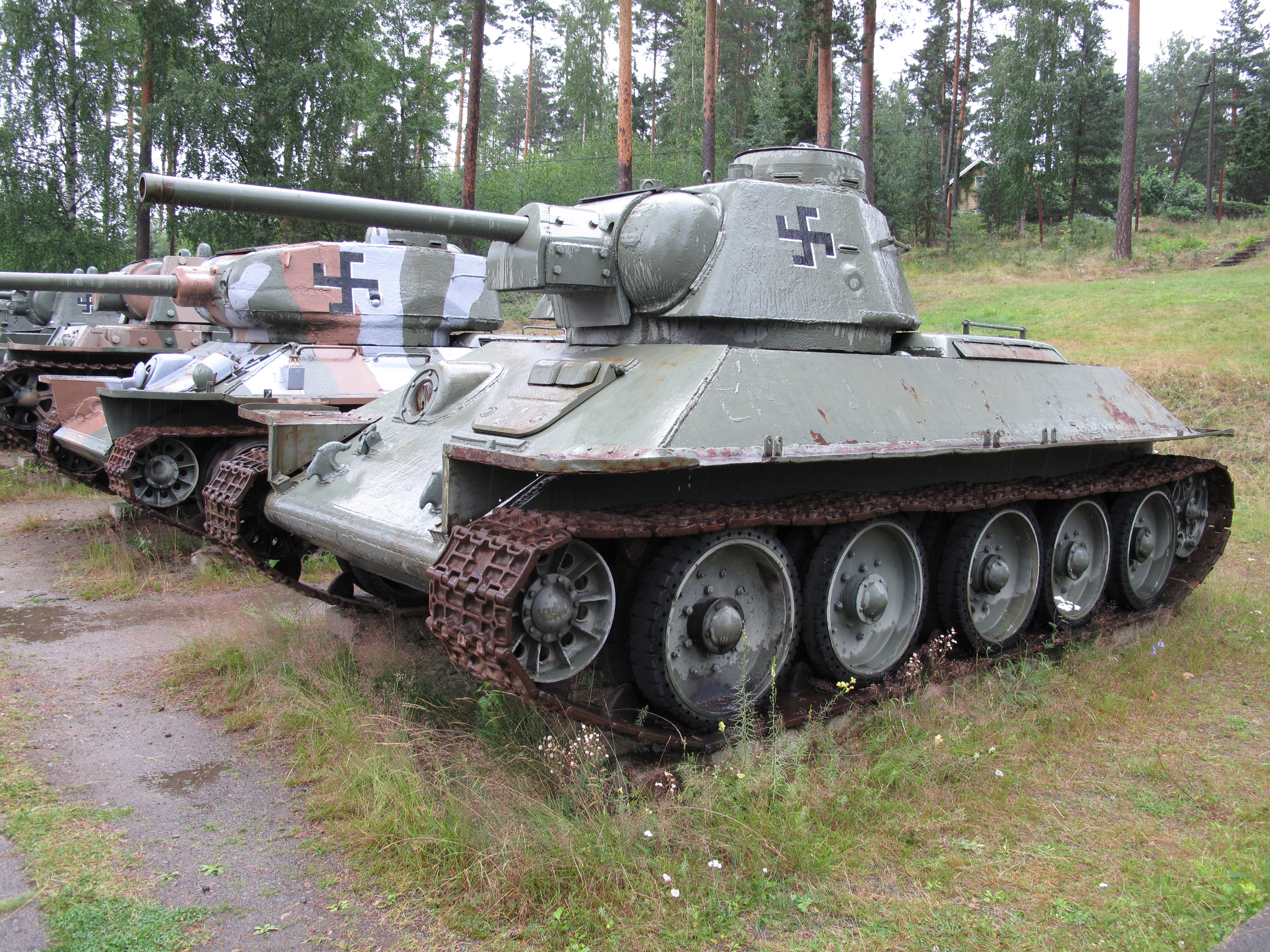
The T-34 medium tank carried over the Christie suspension design from the earlier BT series.

Although the Christie suspension system was never actually sold to Poland, Polish designers managed to create their own form of suspension system based on technical sketches that were obtained from Christie's company. This new system was used in the development of the 10TP cruiser tank that never made it past the prototype stage. Polish engineers found the ability to drive without treads unnecessary, and ditched the Christie-inspired system for a new tracked-only suspension system in their 14TP prototype which was ultimately never completed with the outbreak of World War II and the German invasions of Poland.

== Description ==
Christie suspension as used in his 1931 patent: When the roadwheel (3) is pushed up by an obstacle, the bellcrank (1) it is mounted on is pushed upwards, pivoting around the mounting point where it is attached to the hull. That movement compresses the spring (2), pushing the arm down again.

Christie-derived suspension on Polish 10TP tank: roadwheel (1), spring (2) and bellcrank (3)

The Christie suspension system used large, vertical coil springs connected internally to bellcranks that were used to move each wheel independently. This allowed for vertical movement of the wheels, enabling the tank to go at higher speeds on rough and rugged surfaces. Another feature of the Christie suspension was the wheels, which were fitted with rubber tyres and could function as regular road wheels without the need for treads, allowing a tank with damaged treads to have its treads removed and still be functional. Tanks using the Christie system often lacked return rollers, with the top of the wheels supporting the treads of the tank.

== See also ==
- Horstmann suspension system
- History of the tank
