= Comparison of World War I tanks =

This is a comparison of the characteristics of tanks used in World War I.

== Tanks used in World War I ==
Tank	Country	Year introduced	Production total	Crew	Armament number of rounds	Armour thickness (front/side/top)	Weight	Engine	power/weight ratio	Speed	Range
Mark I Male	UK	1916	75	8	2x QF 6-pdr (57mm) [324], 3×MG [6,272]	12/10/6 mm	28.4 t	Petrol; 105 hp (78 kW)	3.7 hp/t	4.5 km/h (2.8 mph)	37 km (23 mi)
Female	UK	1916	75	8	5× Vickers machine gun, 1x Hotchkiss [30,080]	12/10/6 mm	27.4 t	Petrol; 105 hp (78 kW)	3.7 hp/t	4.5 km/h (2.8 mph)	37 km (23 mi)
Mark IV Male	UK	1917	420	8	2x QF 6-pdr (57mm) 6 cwt (Note: a shortened version of the gun used in the Mark I. The reduction in muzzle velocity was not a problem as the guns fired HE shells over short ranges) [332], 3× .303 Lewis Gun [6,272]	14/12/8 mm	28.5 t	125 hp (93 kW)		5.6 km/h (3.5 mph)	56 km (35 mi)
Female	UK	1917	595 (Note: A further 250 unarmed tanks were built for carrying supplies)	8	5×Lewis guns [10,000]	14/12/8 mm	27 t	125 hp (93 kW)		5.6 km/h (3.5 mph)	56 km (35 mi)
Mark V Male	UK	1918	200	8	QF 6-pdr (57mm) 6 cwt [207], 4×MG [5,800]	14/14/8 mm	29.5 t	150 hp (112 kW)	5.1-5.4 hp/t	7.5 km/h (4.7 mph)	72 km (45 mi)
Female	UK	1918	200	8	6×.303 MG [14,100]	14/14/8 mm	28.5 t	150 hp (112 kW)	5.1-5.4 hp/t	7.5 km/h (4.7 mph)	72 km (45 mi)
Mark V* Male	UK	1918	200	8 (+14infantry (Note: The tank was lengthened to cross wider trenches and the increased internal space was a bonus))	2× 6-pdr [221], 8×MG [8,400]	14/12/6 mm	33 t	150 hp (112 kW)	5.1-5.4 hp/t	4 km/h (2.5 mph)	63 km (39 mi)
Female	UK	1918	432	8 (+14infantry)	10×MG [16,800]	14/12/6 mm	32 t	150 hp (112 kW)	5.1-5.4 hp/t	4 km/h (2.5 mph)	63 km (39 mi)
Medium Mark A Whippet	UK	1918	200	3-4	4×.303 Hotchkiss Mk I machine gun [5,400]	14/14/5 mm	14 t	Petrol 2×45 hp (34 kW)	6.4 hp/t	13 km/h (8.1 mph)	64 km (40 mi)
Schneider CA1	France	1917	400	6	75 mm Blockhaus Schneider [94–96], 2× 8 mm Hotchkiss Mle 1914 machine gun [3,840]	11.5/11.5/5.5 mm	13.5 t	60 hp (45 kW)		8 km/h (5.0 mph)	48 km (30 mi)
Schneider CA1	France	1917	400	6	75 mm Blockhaus Schneider [94–96], 2× 8 mm Hotchkiss Mle 1914 machine gun [3,840]	24/17/5.5 mm	14.6 t	60 hp (45 kW)		8 km/h (5.0 mph)	75 km (47 mi)
Saint-Chamond	France	1917	165	8	75mm Saint-Chamond-Mondragón [106–108], 4× 8 mm MG [7,488]	11.5/17/5.5 mm	22 t	90 hp (67 kW) petrol-electric transmission	4.1 hp/t	12 km/h (7.5 mph)	60 km (37 mi)
Saint-Chamond "Modèle 18"	France	1917	235	8	Canon de 75 modèle 1897 [106–108], 4× 8 mm MG [7,488]	11.5+8/17/5.5 mm	24 t	90 hp (67 kW) petrol-electric transmission	4.1 hp/t	12 km/h (7.5 mph)	60 km (37 mi)
Renault FT mitrailleuse	France	1918	3,694 (Note: The U.S. made 950 M1917 light tanks (a near copy of the FT design), but only 64 were finished before the end of the war, and none saw combat.)	2	8 mm Mle 1914 machine gun [4,800]	16/8/6 mm	6.5 t	35 hp (26 kW)	10.7 hp/t	20 km/h (12 mph)	60 km (37 mi)
Renault FT canon	France	1918	3,694	2	37 mm Puteaux SA 18 [240]	16/8/6 mm	6.7 t	35 hp (26 kW)	10.7 hp/t	20 km/h (12 mph)	60 km (37 mi)
A7V	Germany	1918	20	18	5.7 cm Maxim-Nordenfelt [180], 6×MG 08 (Note: There was, briefly, one A7V with two extra machine guns in place of the 57 mm cannon. It was later converted to use the 57mm cannon) [10,000–15,000]	30/20/10 mm	32 t	2×100 hp (75 kW)	6.25 hp/t	15 km/h (9.3 mph)	80 km (50 mi)

== Immediate post-war tanks ==
Tanks planned for production and with completed prototypes during the war, but entered service after it ended.

Prototype-World War I Tanks that entered service after, but as designed in World War I
Name	Country	Year	Planned prod./actual total	Crew	Armament [ammo (rds.)]	Armour thickness (front/side/top)	Weight (tonnes)	Engine	Speed	Range
FCM Char 2C	France	1918	300+/10	12	Canon de 75 modèle 1897, 4× 7.92 mm MG	45/22/10 mm	70 t	Petrol 2×200/250 hp	15 km/h	160 km
Mark VIII	US/UK	1918	1500/125	12	2× 6 pdr; 7 MGs	16/16/6 mm	33.6 t	Petrol 300/340 hp	8 km/h	89 km (55 mi)
Medium Mark B	UK	1918								
Medium Mark C	UK	1918			5 Machine guns					
LK II	(Germany)	1918	580/24	3	37mm or 7,92mm MG	14/8/?	8,75 t	Petrol 60 hp (45 kW)	14 km/h	65–70 km

== See also ==
- Comparison of early World War II tanks
- History of the tank
