= Vickers Medium Mark I =

British medium tank

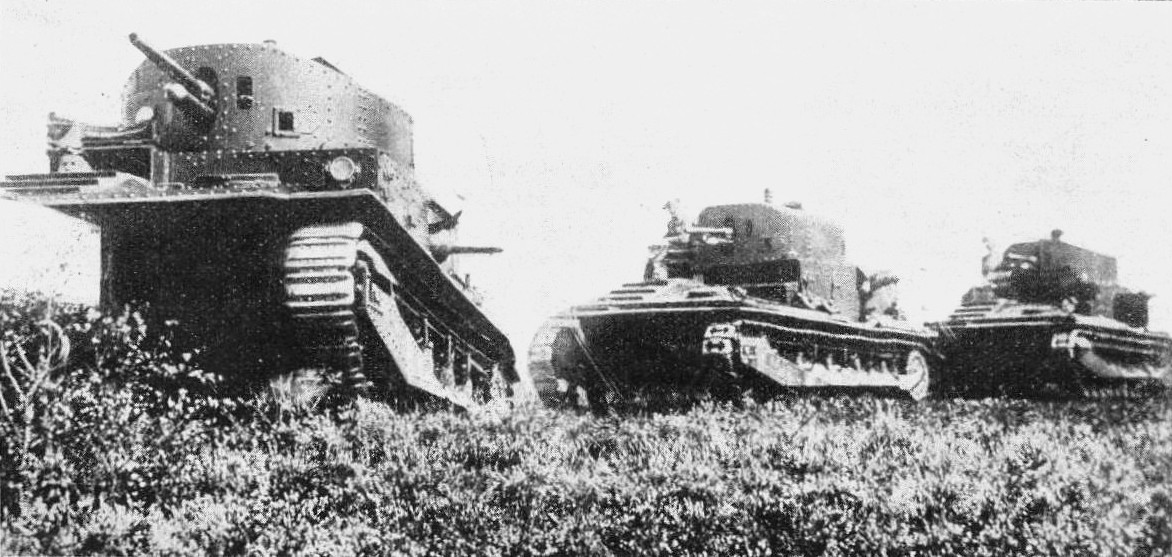
- Vickers tanks on the move in England in the 1930s
- Type: Medium tank
- Place of origin: United Kingdom

Production history
- Manufacturer: Vickers

Specifications (Mk I)
- Mass: 11.7 long tons
- Length: 17 ft 6 in (5.33 m)
- Width: 9 ft 1.5 in (2.781 m)
- Height: 9 ft 3 in (2.82 m)
- Crew: 5
- Armour: 6.25 mm
- Main armament: QF 3 pounder gun (47 mm)
- Secondary armament: four 0.303 (7.7 mm) Hotchkiss M1909 Benét–Mercié machine guns two 0.303 Vickers machine guns
- Engine: Armstrong Siddeley V-8 air-cooled petrol engine 90 hp (67 kW)
- Transmission: 4-speed gearbox to a 2-speed epicyclic
- Suspension: helical spring
- Operational range: 120 mi (190 km)
- Maximum speed: 15 mph (24 km/h)

The Vickers Medium Mark I was a British tank of the Inter-war period built by Vickers from 1924.

== Background ==
After the First World War Britain disbanded most of its tank units leaving only five tank battalions equipped with the Mark V and the Medium Mark C. At first a large budget was made available for tank design but this was all spent on the failed development of the Medium Mark D. When the government design bureau, the Tank Design Department, was closed in 1923 any direct official involvement in tank development was terminated. However private enterprise in the form of the Vickers-Armstrong company built two prototypes of a new tank in 1921.

== Vickers Light Tank ==
In 1920 the Infantry had plans to acquire a Light Infantry Tank. Colonel Johnson of the Tank Design Department derived such a type from the Medium Mark D. In competition Vickers built the Vickers Light Tank.

The Vickers design still was reminiscent of the Great War types. It had a high, lozenge-shaped, track frame with side doors but it also showed some improvements. There was a fully revolving turret and the suspension was provided by vertical helical springs, while the Medium Mark C still had a fixed turret and was unsprung. The Vickers was much smaller than the Medium C at just 7 feet (210 cm) high and weighing only 8.5 short tons (7.7 t). It was driven by a separately compartmented 86 hp (64 kW) engine through an advanced hydraulic Williams-Jenney transmission, allowing infinitely variable turn cycles. The first prototype was a "Female" version with three Hotchkiss machine guns; the second prototype was a "Male" which had a 3-pounder (47 mm) gun in place of one of the machine guns and also a machine gun for anti-aircraft use. It looked far closer to a modern tank than its predecessors with the turret, the front of the fighting compartment and the hull front plate all strongly rounded. The advanced transmission proved to be utterly unreliable however and the project was abandoned in 1922 in favour of a generally more conventional design, the Vickers Light Tank Mark I. This would be renamed the "Vickers Medium Tank Mark I" in 1924 . The first prototypes were sent to Bovington for trial in 1923. The General Staff designation was A2E1.

== Description ==
Despite being in general more conventional, in one aspect the Medium Mark I looked rather modern: instead of a high track run it possessed a low and flat suspension system with five bogies, each having a pair of small double wheels. The axles of these were too weakly constructed; as Major-General N.W. Duncan put it in his Medium Marks I-III: "(...) a perpetual nuisance. The axles were continually breaking and the path of the Mark I tanks was littered with discarded wheels". This was cured by switching to a "box bogie" in 1931. To ease repairs the suspension was not protected by an armoured covering. There were two vertical helical springs of unequal length in each of the five bogie casings attached to the hull. In front and behind the normal ten road wheel pairs, there was a tension wheel pair. Ground pressure was very high, even though at 11.7 long tons (11.9 t) the vehicle was not very heavy for its size.

The engine was an air-cooled 90 hp Armstrong Siddeley engine derived from an aircraft type. Surprisingly the engine and transmission was distributed throughout the hull - with the engine to the left of the driver, the gearbox underneath the commander and final drive at the rear, which Duncan describes as "an unbelievable retrograde step in view of war-time experience". The Medium Mark B and the Mark VIII heavy had introduced compartmentalisation to reduce the debilitating effects of engine noise and fumes on the crew. However, with the Medium Mark I considerations of ease of maintenance took precedence.

The engine drove, via a multiple dry-plate clutch, a four-speed gearbox. It had no synchromesh and switching between gears without excessive noise was a challenge to the driver. A propeller shaft connected the gearbox to a bevel box at the end of the tank which divided the power to a separate epicyclic gear for each track. These gears automatically provided extra emergency torsion to the normal first and second gear if the vehicle suddenly slowed down due to an obstacle or soft ground.

The petrol tanks were at the very rear of the hull, so the fuel lines had to run along the whole length of the vehicle, pumping fuel to a secondary tank that fed the engine by gravity. The engine was lubricated and partially cooled by oil; leakage was common and the original 4 imp gal (18 L) reservoir had to be replaced by a 13.5 imp gal (61 L) one. The tank could be electrically started, but only if the motor was already warm, so the first start had to be done by hand from the inside of the vehicle. Maximum speed was about 15 mph (24 km/h) and the range about 120 mi (190 km).

There was a cylindrical bevelled turret on top of the hull that carried a "Quick Firing" (shell and cartridge in one complete round) three-pounder gun (47 mm calibre) and four ball mountings for Hotchkiss machine guns. A novel, unique feature was a three-man turret. This meant that commander was not distracted with performing either the loader's or gunner's tasks and could fully concentrate on maintaining situational awareness. This gave a huge potential combat advantage, but went largely unnoticed at the time. Except for the Lago prototype, a predecessor to the Stridsvagn m/42, produced by Landsverk in 1934 no other manufacturer constructed a tank with a three-man turret until the German Panzer III. The practical importance of this feature is signified by the fact that later into the Second World War, most of both sides tank designs either quickly switched to the three-man turret, or were abandoned as obsolete.

There was no co-axial machine gun. There was only room to operate one machine gun from the turret; normally one gun was switched between the respective mountings as the guns were removable. The turret machine gunner doubled as main gun loader. In each side of the hull was a Vickers machine gun. There was one gunner to operate these, he also functioned as a mechanic.

The shape of the Mark I Medium hull was very distinctive. The back was a simple armoured box; the front plate was high and perfectly vertical. Between them, from the armoured hood of the driver at the right of the vehicle six armour plates fanned out to the left, making for a complex hull geometry at that side. In all the tank made an ungainly squat impression. The crew of five was only poorly protected by 6.25 mm plating, riveted to the chassis, barely enough to counter the threat posed by light machine guns. With its many shot traps the vehicle was unable to withstand even anti-tank rifle fire and it had a high-profile. The internal lay-out worsened this vulnerability as the petrol tanks were inside the main compartment.

== Operational history ==
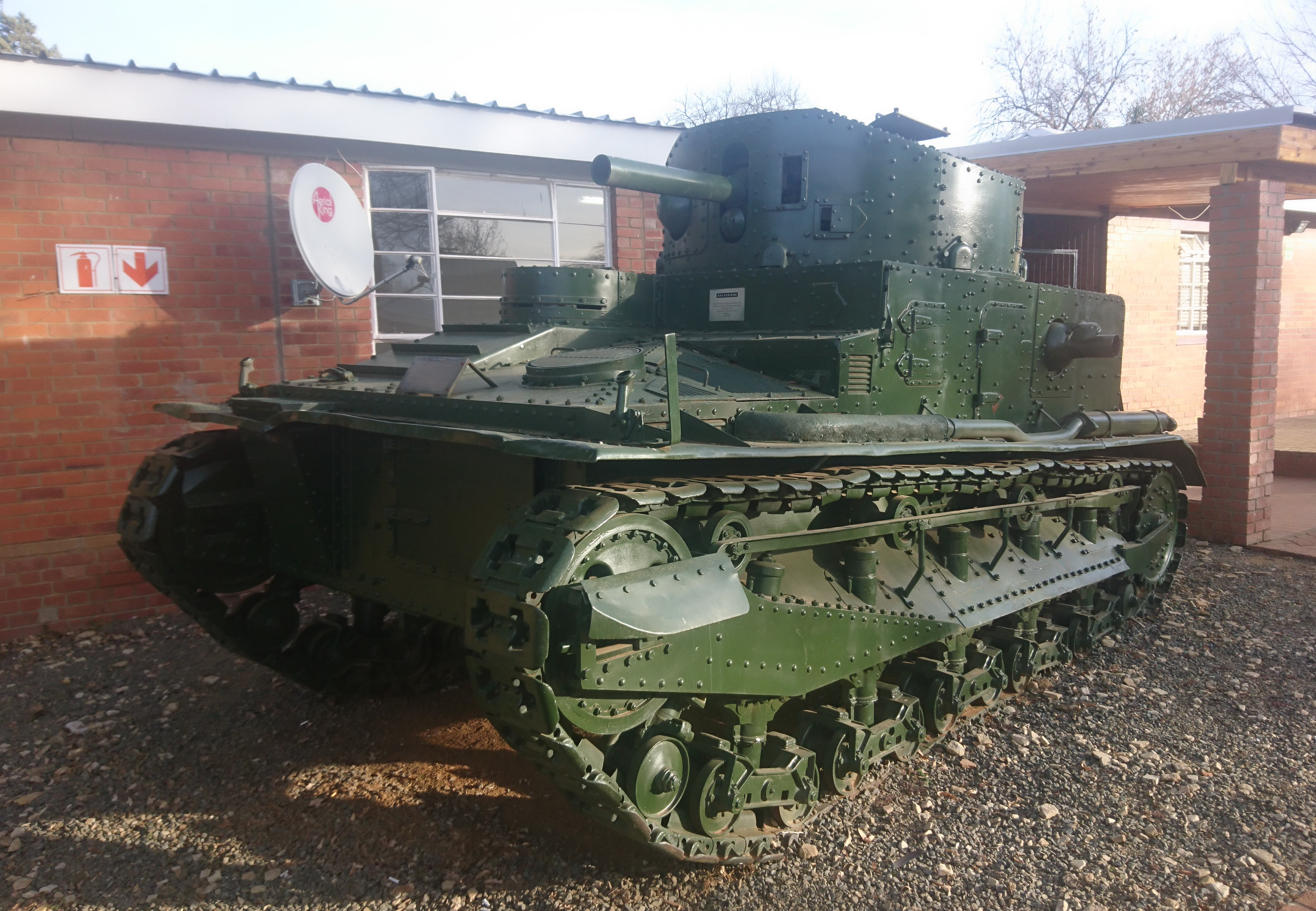
The surviving Vickers Medium Mk.I at the Special Service Battalion museum

The Medium Mark I replaced some of the Mark V heavy tanks. Together with its successor, the slightly improved Vickers Medium Mark II, it served in the Royal Tank Regiments, being the first type of the in total 200 tanks to be phased out in 1938.

The Medium Mark I was the first tank to see "mass" production since the last of the ten Char 2C's was finished in 1921. As only about thirty of the next most produced tank, the Renault NC27, were built, the British Mediums represented most of the world tank production during the 1920s. They never fired a shot in anger and their performance in a real battle can only be speculated upon but, as the only modern tanks in existence in the decade after the First World War, they provided the British with a unique opportunity to test the many new ideas about mechanised warfare using real operational units. The knowledge thus gained would prove invaluable in the Second World War.

=== Operators ===
- United Kingdom
- Romania (proposed) – In 1926, the Reșița works proposed to locally produce a British Vickers tank under license. The tank would have weighed 10.5t and would have been able to reach 24 km/h. The proposal was rejected by the Romanian army because of the tank's characteristics being considered inadequate. Although not specifically stated, the given characteristics indicate that the tank in question was the Medium Mark I.

== Variants ==
- Medium Mark I: first type of which thirty were built from 1924 onwards.
- Medium Mark IA: fifty were built of a slightly improved type with 8 mm armour at the vertical surfaces, a split driver's hood, a bevelled back plate of the turret to facilitate anti-aircraft fire by the Hotchkiss machine gun and improved brow and chin pads for the gunners. The Mark IA's could be started from the outside. The troublesome bogies were replaced on all eighty tanks by a stronger type.
- Medium Mark IA*: the original tank turrets were rebuilt and upgraded by removing the Hotchkiss mountings, installing a front Vickers machine gun, compensating for its weight with a lead counterweight at the back of the turret and putting a "Bishops's Mitre" traversable cupola on top.
- Medium Mark I CS and Medium Mark IA CS: a dozen tanks were rebuilt as close support vehicles, mainly for smoke laying, equipped with a 15-pounder mortar.
- Experimental Wheel and Track Medium Mark I: this was a wheel-cum-track project of 1926 to improve strategic mobility by overcoming track wear. The tank could be elevated by jacks on four enormous rubber-tyred wheels, two to be lowered at its extremes, the front ones steerable. The back ones could be driven, making the vehicle look "rather like a house perched on a very inadequate roller skate"; more practical was to tow it by a truck. This vehicle was also equipped with an experimental driver's hood. The contraption was later removed.

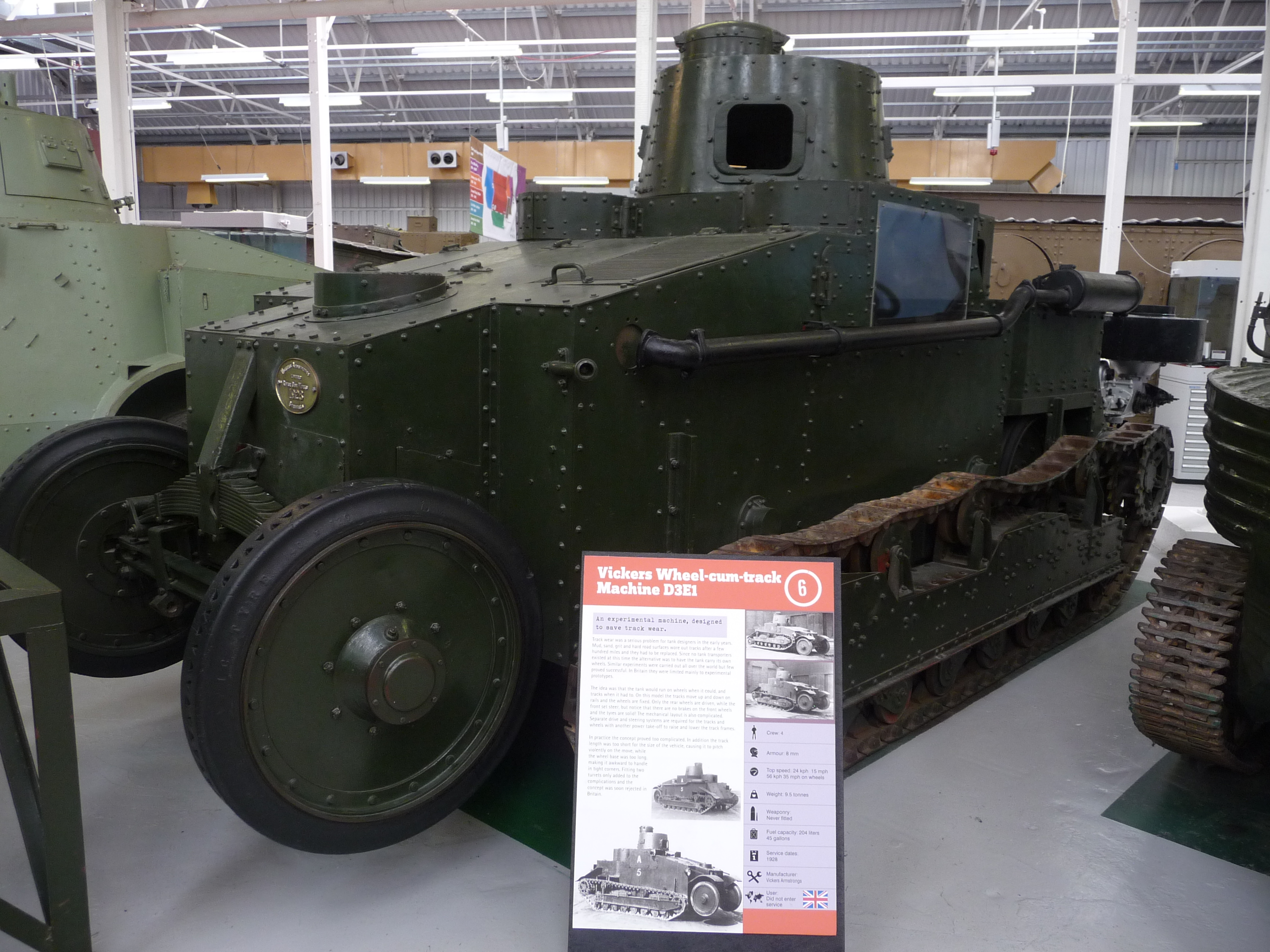
The Experimental D3E1 Wheel-cum-Track vehicle at The Tank Museum, Bovington, UK. This used some parts from the Medium MkI but was otherwise unrelated. Bovington does have a Medium MkII

On one Medium Mark I the engine was replaced by a Ricardo 90 hp (67 kW) diesel engine.

== Surviving vehicles ==
One Vickers Medium Mark I has survived at the Special Service Battalion Museum, Bloemfontein, South Africa.

A 3-pounder gun taken from a Vickers Medium Mark I survives on the Vickers A1E1 Independent at Bovington.
