= Vickers A1E1 Independent =

British heavy tank prototype

Vickers A1E1 "Independent"
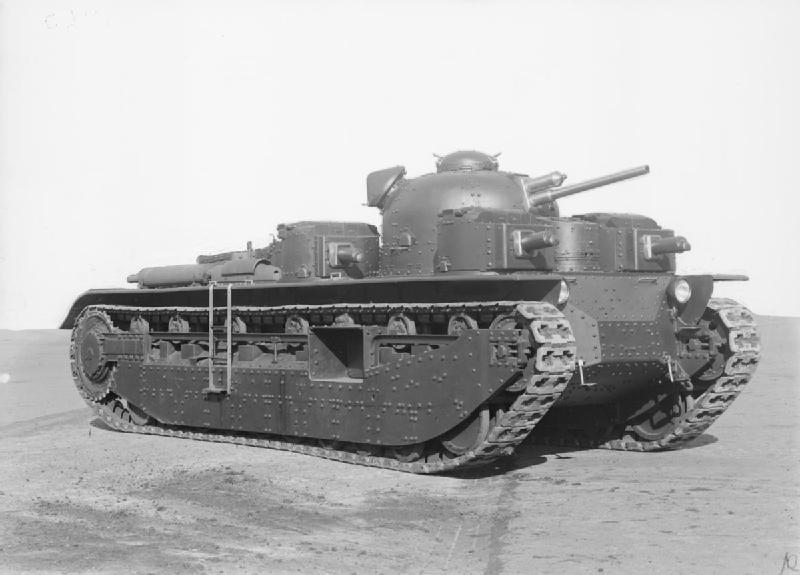
- The Vickers A1E1 in 1925
- Type: Tank
- Place of origin: United Kingdom

Production history
- Manufacturer: Vickers
- No. built: 1

Specifications
- Mass: 33 long tons (34 t; 37 short tons)
- Length: 24 ft 11 in (7.59 m)
- Width: 8 ft 9 in (2.67 m)
- Height: 8 ft 11 in (2.72 m)
- Crew: 8
- Armour: 13–28 mm (0.51–1.10 in)
- Main armament: QF 3 pounder gun (47 mm)
- Secondary armament: 4 × 0.303 Vickers machine gun
- Engine: Armstrong Siddeley V12 petrol 370 hp (280 kW)
- Transmission: 4 forward, 1 reverse
- Suspension: coil spring bogies
- Operational range: 95 miles (153 km)
- Maximum speed: 20 mph (32 km/h)

The Independent A1E1 is a multi-turreted tank that was designed by the British armaments manufacturer Vickers between the First and Second World Wars. Although it only ever reached the prototype stage, and only a single example was built, it influenced many other tank designs.

The A1E1 design can be seen as a possible influence on the Soviet T-100 and T-28 tanks, the German Neubaufahrzeug tanks, and the British Medium Mk III and Cruiser Mk I (triple turret) tank designs. The Soviet T-35 tank was heavily influenced by its design.

== Design ==
The Independent was a multi-turret design, having a central gun turret armed with the 3 pounder (47 mm) gun, and four subsidiary turrets, each armed with a .303 inch Vickers machine gun. The subsidiary turrets were mounted two at the front and two to the rear of the turret (about halfway along the hull). The gun of the left rear turret was able to elevate to engage aircraft. The tank was designed to have heavy firepower, self-defence capability, and superiority to enemy weapons. It had a crew of eight, the commander communicating with the crew through an intercom system. The Independent was never used in combat, but other armies studied it and a few adopted designs derived from it.

== History ==
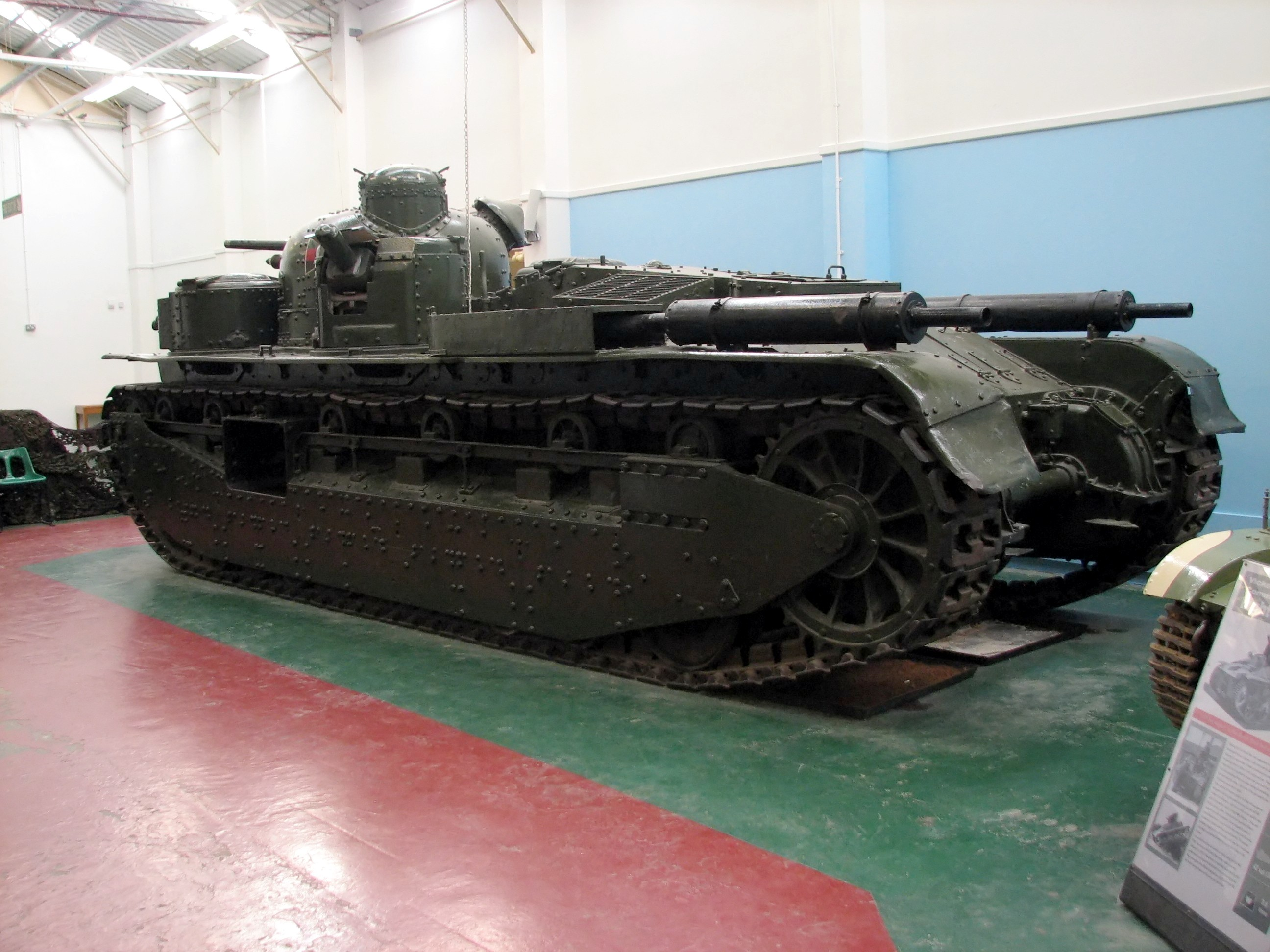
The A1E1 at The Tank Museum (2008)

Planning for the A1E1 began in December 1922 when the General Staff of the British Army drew up a specification. This was for a turret-less tank with at least 9 feet (2.7 m) of trench crossing ability. On receiving the specification, Vickers began design work on a vehicle that followed the General Staff's ideas and also a multi-turreted design of their own. The two designs were offered to the General Staff, which opted for the Vickers multi-turreted design. An order for a prototype was formally placed on 15 September 1926 but some work appears to have begun before this date.

The tank was largely designed by Walter Gordon Wilson; its 35.8-litre (2,180 cu in) V12 air-cooled engine was designed by Armstrong Siddeley. It also incorporated a new hydraulic braking system, which had to be specially developed due to its weight and speed. The prototype was delivered to the War Office in 1926, and displayed to the firsts of the Dominions that year.

In 1928, the rear of the tank was modified to strengthen it. At the same time, a new design of brake-block was fitted. The transmission was also heavily reworked.

The tank was the subject of industrial and political espionage, the plans ending up in the Soviet Union, where they may have influenced the design of the T-28 and T-35 tanks. In 1933, a British army lieutenant, Norman Baillie-Stewart, was court-martialled and served five years in prison for providing the photographs and specifications of the Independent (among other secrets) to a contact in the German intelligence service.

The Independent remained in experimental use until it was retired in 1935 due to being worn out. During the Second World War, the tank was set up to act as a static pillbox or defensive position to protect Bovington Camp in the event of a German invasion. For this, it was fitted with a working 3-pounder taken from a Vickers Medium Mark I to replace the gun it had been originally fitted with (which probably never worked). It is now preserved at the Bovington Tank Museum although the interior of the tank is currently inaccessible due to the presence of high levels of asbestos.
