= Medium Mark A Whippet =

Medium Mk A Whippet
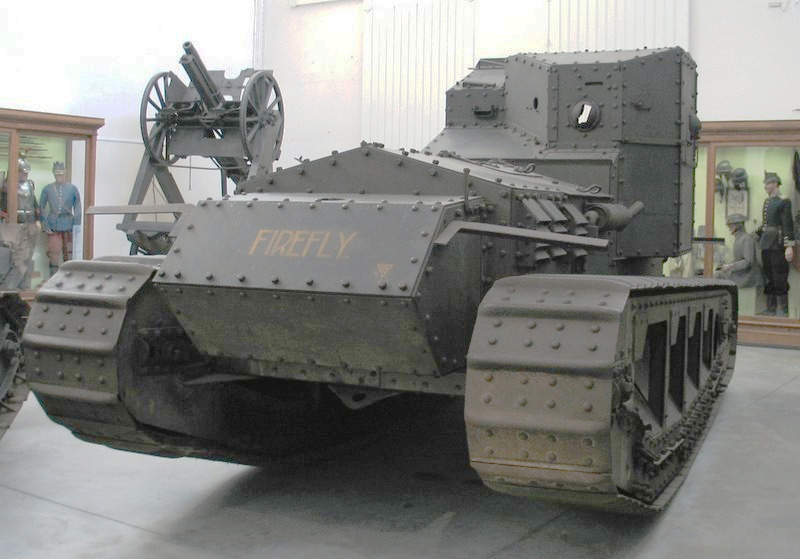
- Whippet Firefly of F Battalion in The Museum of the Army in Brussels (original colours)
- Type: Medium tank
- Place of origin: United Kingdom

Service history
- In service: 1918–1945
- Used by: United Kingdom; Russian State; Soviet Union (captured); German Empire (captured); Weimar Republic; Empire of Japan
- Wars: World War I German revolution of 1918–1919; Anglo-Irish War; Russian Civil War; World War II

Production history
- Designer: William Tritton
- Manufacturer: Fosters of Lincoln
- Produced: 1917–1918
- No. built: 200 by 14 March 1919

Specifications
- Mass: 14 long tons (14 t)
- Length: 20 ft (6.10 m)
- Width: 8 ft 7 in (2.62 m)
- Height: 9 ft (2.74 m)
- Crew: 3-4
- Armour: 14 mm (0.55 in) maximum
- Main armament: 4 × 0.303-inch (7.7mm) Hotchkiss machine guns
- Engine: 2× Tylor Twin 4-cylinder side-valve JB4 petrol engine 2x 45 hp (33 kW)
- Power/weight: 6.4 hp/tonne
- Transmission: 4 forward speeds and 1 reverse
- Suspension: None
- Maximum speed: 13.4 km/h (8.33 mph)
- References: Fletcher

The Medium Mark A Whippet was a medium tank employed by the British in World War I. Developed for fast mobile assaults, it was intended to complement the slower British heavy tanks by using its relative mobility and speed in exploiting any break in the enemy lines.

Although the track design appears more "modern" than the British Tanks Mark I to V, it was directly derived from Little Willie, the first tank prototype (itself directly taken from the track design of the Holt tractor), and was unsprung. The crew compartment was a fixed, polygonal turret at the rear of the vehicle, and two engines of the type used in contemporary double-decker buses were in a forward compartment, driving one track each.

== Development ==
On 3 October 1916 William Tritton, about to be knighted (Note: He was knighted in February 1917) for developing the Mark I, proposed to the Tank Supply Committee that a faster and cheaper tank, equipped with two engines like the Flying Elephant, should be built to exploit gaps that the heavier but slow tanks made, an idea that up till then had been largely neglected. This was accepted on 10 November and approved by the War Office on 25 November. At that time the name for the project was the Tritton Chaser. Traditionally, the name Whippet (after the fast-running dog breed) is attributed to Sir William himself. Actual construction started on 21 December.

The first prototype, with a revolving turret taken from an Austin armoured car – the first for a British tank design, as Little Willie's original turret was fixed – was ready on 3 February 1917 and participated (probably without one) in the tank trials day at Oldbury on 3 March. The next day, in a meeting with the French to coordinate allied tank production, the Commander-in-Chief of the British forces Field Marshal Haig ordered the manufacture of two hundred vehicles, the first to be ready on 31 July. Although he was acting beyond his authority, as usual, his decisions were confirmed in June 1917. The production model had the turret replaced with a fixed armoured structure and the fuel tank was moved from the rear of the vehicle to the front.

The first production tanks left the factory in October and two were delivered to the first unit to use them, F Battalion of the Tank Corps (later 6th Battalion), on 14 December 1917. In December 1917 the order was increased from 200 to 385 but this was later cancelled in favour of more advanced designs, the Medium Mark B, Medium Mark C and Medium Mark D.

== Design ==
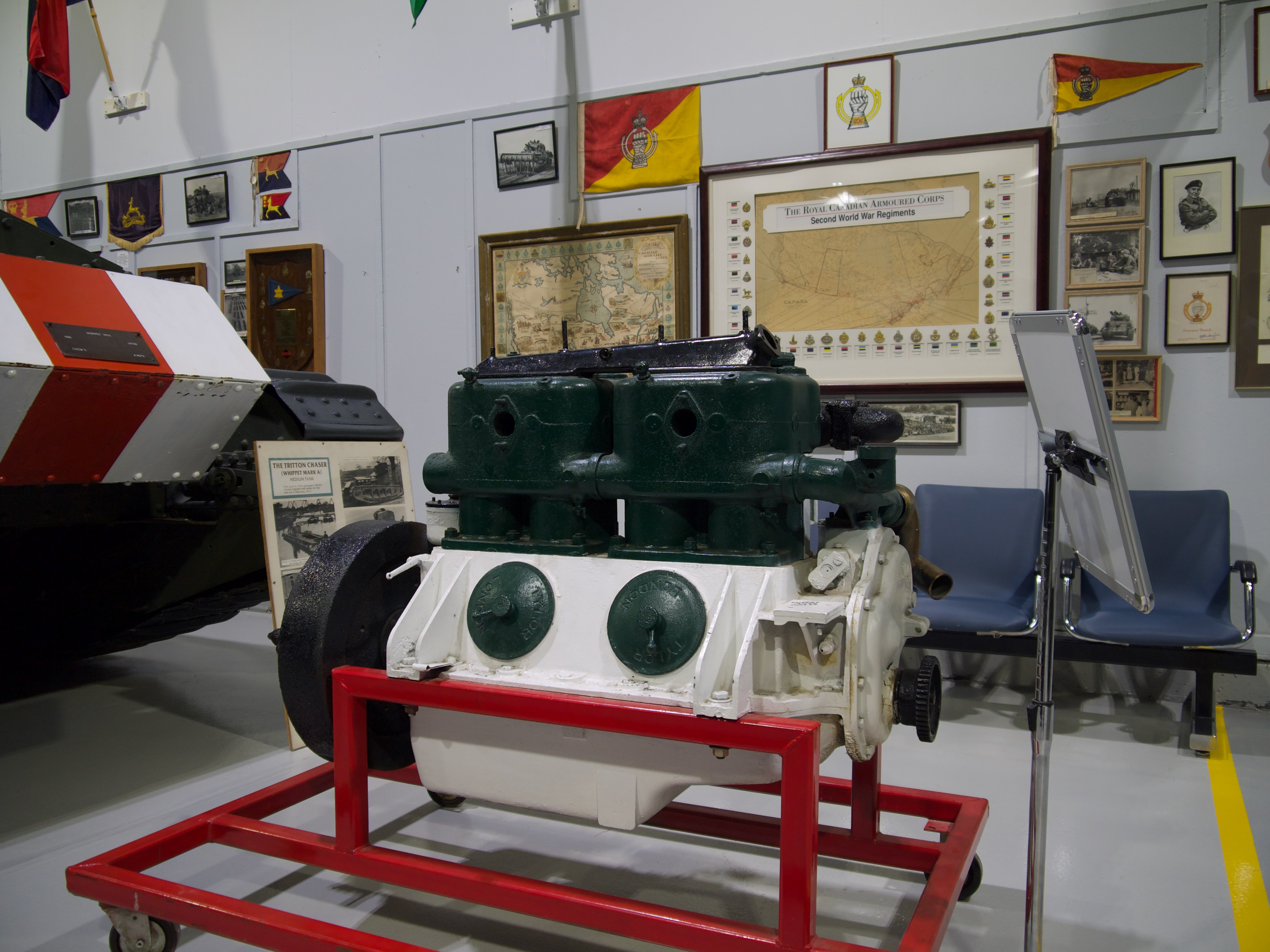
Tylor JB4 engine

When driving in a straight line the two engines were locked; turning the steering wheel gradually closed the throttle for the engine of one track and opened the throttle for the engine driving the other. The two engines were joined at their cross-shafts, from which the final drive to the tracks was by chains to sprockets on either side. When steering the clutches joining the cross-shafts were released, one engine sped up while the other slowed down, the turn being on the side opposite to that of the faster running engine. The steering effect could be increased by use of the brakes on one engine or another. This arrangement had the advantage over that of earlier tanks of being controlled by one man only, but called for great skill on the part of the driver, because one or both of the engines could be stalled if care was not exercised. Although in theory a simple solution to give gradual steering, in practice it proved impossible to control the speeds of the engines, causing the vehicle to take an unpredictable path. Drivers grew wary and stopped the vehicle and locked one track before every turn; this caused many track breaks, as the movement became too abrupt. Nevertheless, the vehicle could easily negotiate shell craters. Crews that believed that treads had to be as long as the hull, as with the heavy tanks, were surprised to see the Whippet, with shorter tracks, successfully exit holes.

The fuel tank was in the front of the hull. The sides featured large mud chutes which allowed mud falling from the upper treads to slide away from the tank, instead of clogging the track plates and rollers.

Armament was four 0.303-inch (7.7mm) Hotchkiss Mk 1 machine guns, one covering each direction. As there were only three crewmen, the gunner had to jump around a lot, though often assisted by the commander. Sometimes a second gunner was carried in the limited space, and often a machine gun was removed to give more room, as the machine guns could be moved from one mounting position to another to cover all sides.

== Combat history ==
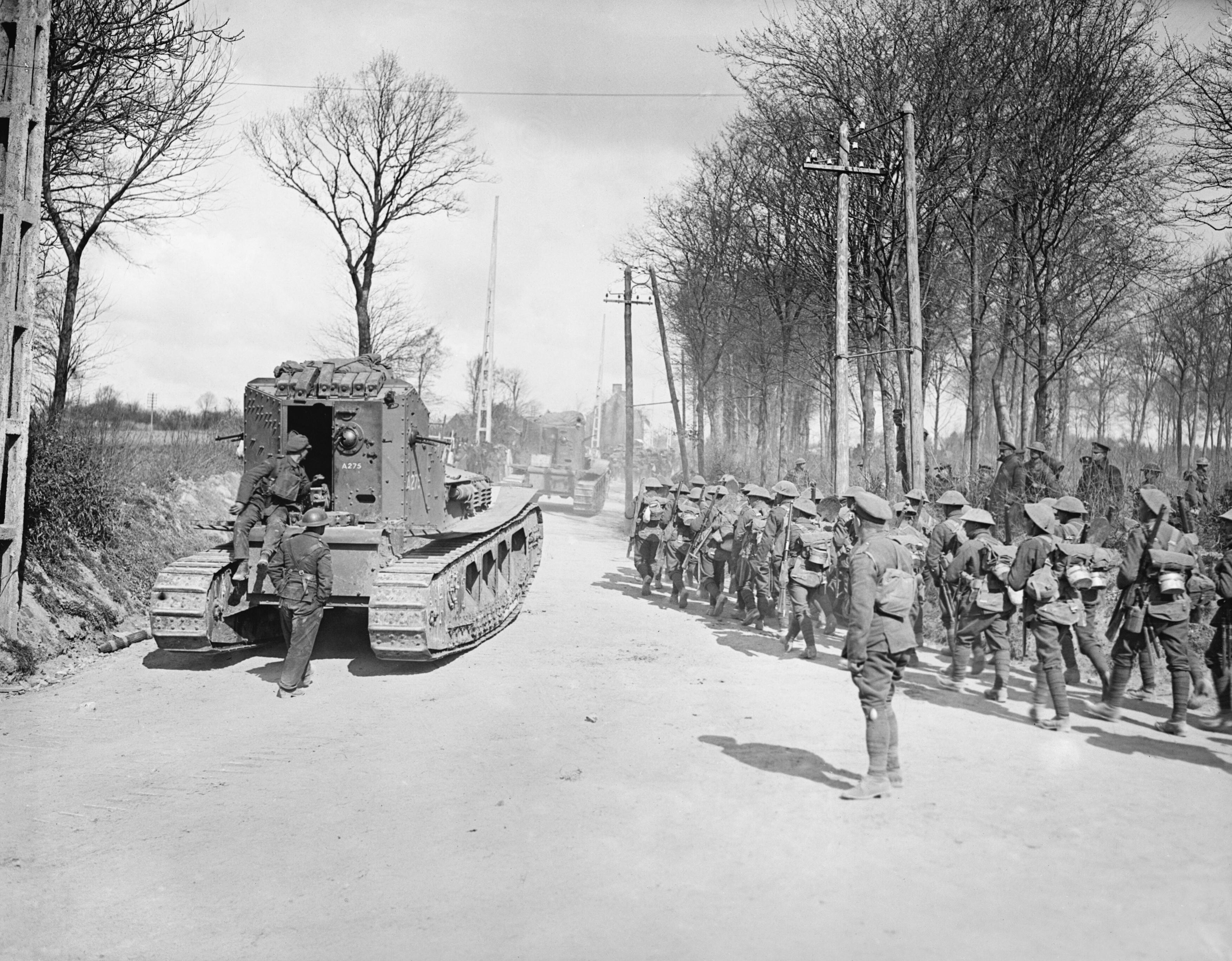
Whippets of 3rd Battalion at Maillet-Mailly on 26 March 1918. Some, in action earlier in the day, were the first Whippets to be used. (Infantry are of the New Zealand Division.)

Whippets arrived late in the First World War, at a time when the British Expeditionary Force, recovering from the Third Battle of Ypres in Flanders, was quite inactive. They first went into action in March 1918 and proved very useful to cover the fighting withdrawal of the infantry divisions recoiling from the German onslaught during the German spring offensive. Whippets were then assigned to the normal Tank Battalions as extra "X-companies". In an engagement near Cachy, a Whippet company of seven tanks wiped out two German infantry battalions caught in the open, killing or wounding over 400. That same day, 24 April, one Whippet was destroyed by a German A7V in the world's second tank battle, the only time a Whippet fought an enemy tank.

The Whippet was, as a British tank veteran wrote, "the big surprise" of the Royal Tank Corps. Crews used their vehicles' speed to attack troops in the rear. They were so successful that by summer 1918 civilians "seemed to talk in terms of whippets", not knowing of heavy tanks' importance in breaking through fortifications and barbed wire. British losses were so high however that plans to equip five Tank Battalions (Light) with 36 Whippets each had to be abandoned. In the end only the 3rd Tank Brigade had Whippets, 48 in each of its two battalions (3rd and 6th TB). Alongside Mark IV and V tanks, they took part in the Battle of Amiens (8 August 1918) which was described by the German supreme commander, General Ludendorff, as "the Black Day of the German Army". The Whippets broke through into the German rear areas causing the loss of the artillery in an entire front sector, a devastating blow from which the Germans were unable to recover. During this battle, one Whippet – Musical Box – advanced so far it was cut off behind German lines. For nine hours it roamed at will, destroying an artillery battery, an observation balloon, the camp of an infantry battalion and a transport column of the German 225th Division, inflicting many casualties. At one point, cans of petrol being carried on Musical Box's roof were ruptured by small-arms fire and fuel leaked into the cabin; the crew had to don gas masks to survive the fumes. Eventually, a German shell disabled it and as the crew abandoned the tank, one of them was shot and killed and the other two were taken prisoner. “Musical Box” was captured by the Germans, however it was retaken by the British later on in the war. The tank survived the war, and although most likely scrapped post war, 2 other Whippet tanks that saw extensive action are in Museums; A347 Firefly and A259 Caesar II,

The Germans captured fewer than fifteen Whippets, two of which were in running condition. They were kept exclusively for tests and training purpose during the war, but one of them saw action afterwards with the Freikorps in the German Revolution of 1918–1919. The Germans gave them the designation Beutepanzer A.

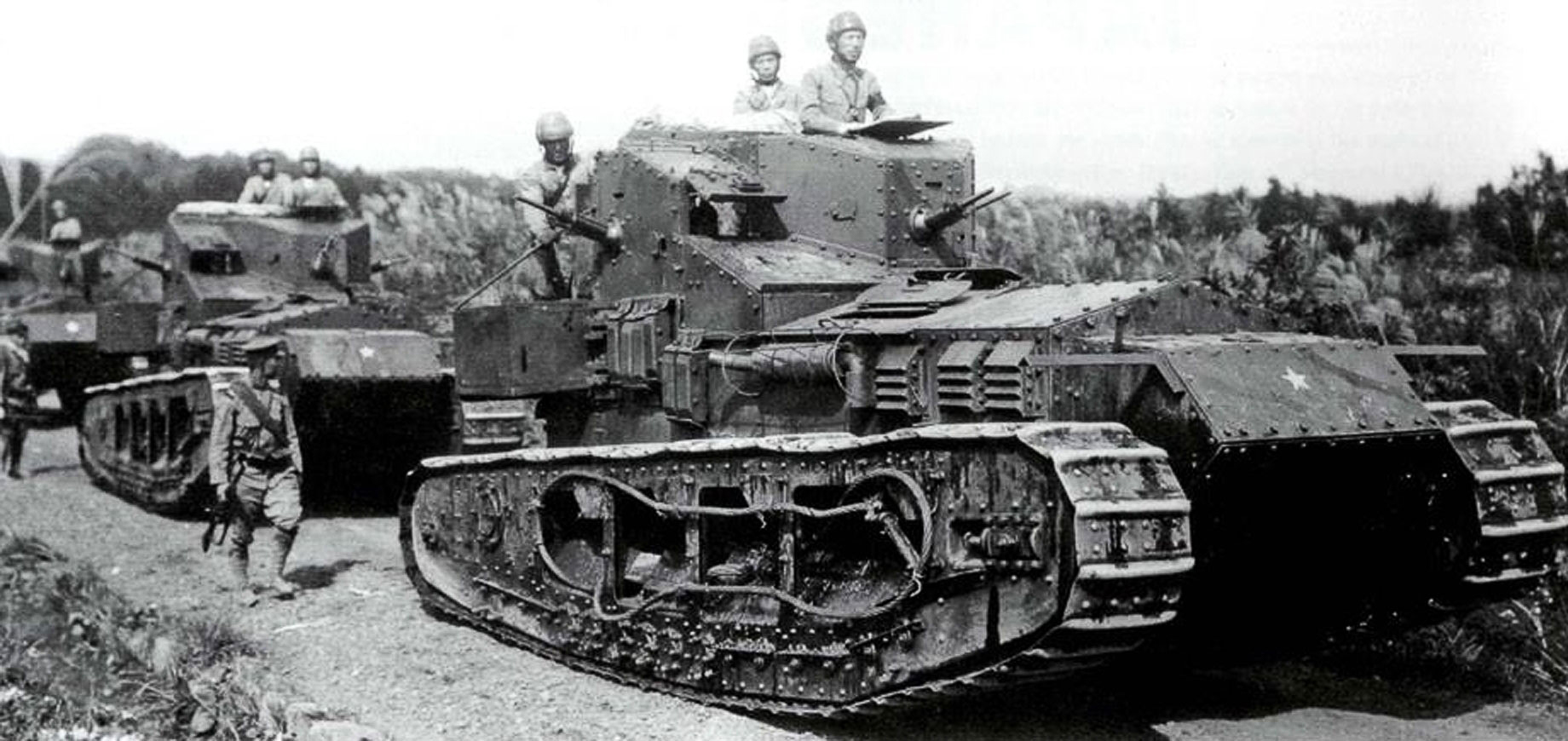
Japanese Whippets

After the war, Whippets were sent to Ireland during the Anglo-Irish War as part of the British forces there, serving with 17th Battalion, Royal Tank Corps. Seventeen were sent with the Expedition Forces in support of the Whites against Soviet Russia. The Red Army captured twelve, using them until the 1930s and fitted at least one vehicle with a French 37 mm Puteaux gun. The Soviets, incorrectly assuming that the name of the engine was "Taylor" instead of "Tylor" (a mistake many sources still make) called the tank the Tyeilor. A few (perhaps six) were exported to Japan, where they remained in service until around 1930.

Whippets were used by the Imperial Japanese Army in Manchukuo and during World War II.

== Variants ==
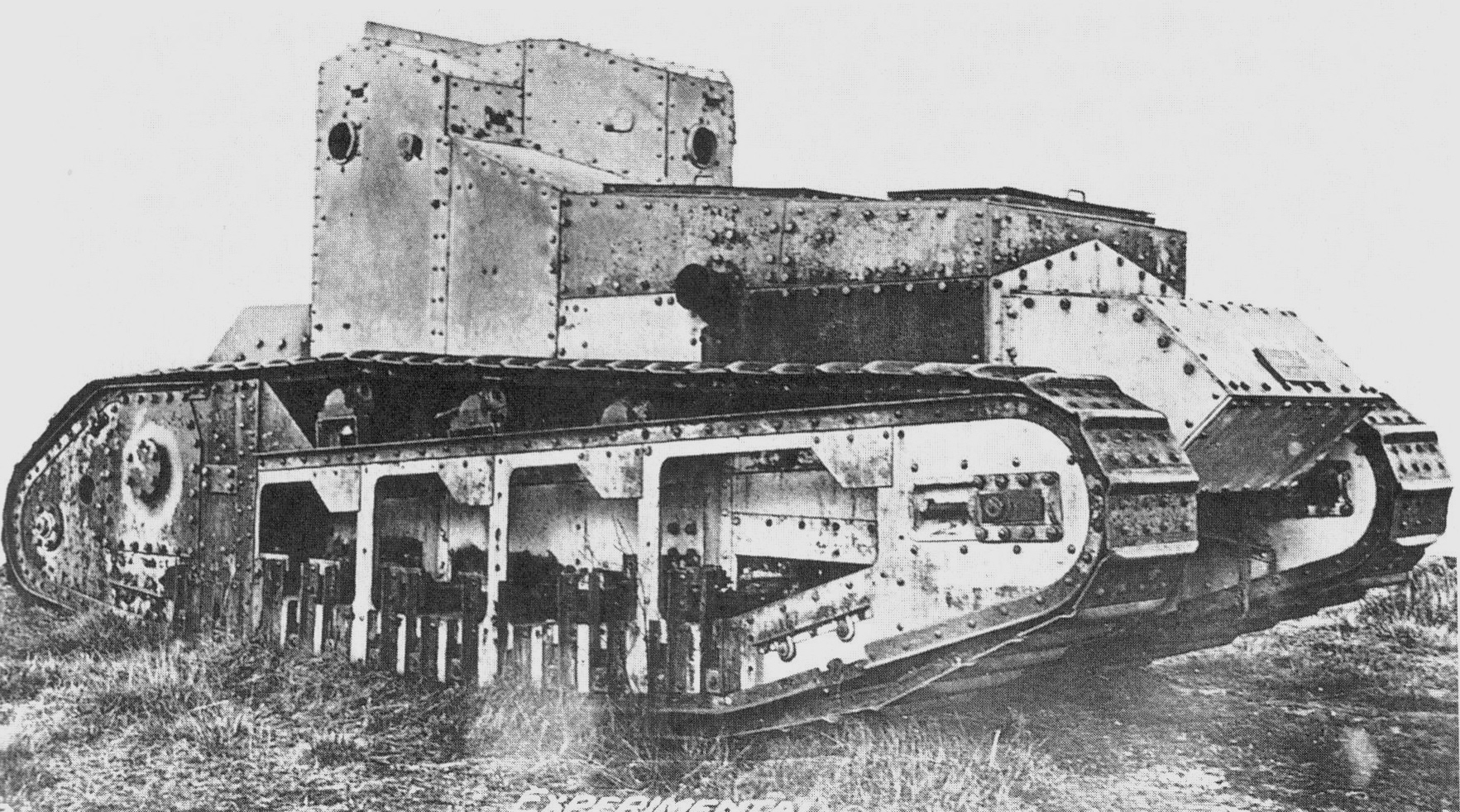
The fast Whippet-Mark V hybrid constructed by Johnson

Major Philip Johnson, the unofficial head of Central Tank Corps Workshops in France, as soon as he received them began fitting one of the Whippets with leaf springs. Later, in 1918, he fitted this vehicle with sprung track rollers, Walter Gordon Wilson's epicyclical transmission from the Mark V and a 360 hp (270 kW) V12 Rolls-Royce Eagle aero-engine. A top speed of about 30 mph (48 km/h) was reached. This project made Johnson the best qualified man to develop the later fast Medium Mark D, which looks like a reversed Medium A. Other experiments included the fitting of a large trailing wheel taken from an old Mark I tank and attaching a climbing tail, in both cases attempts to increase trench-crossing ability.

For a time it was assumed that after the war some Whippets were rebuilt as armoured recovery vehicles, but this was not the case.

The Medium Mark B, a completely different design by Wilson, also had the name "Whippet". For a time it was common to describe any of the lighter tank designs as a Whippet, even the French Renault FT. It had become a generic name.

The German Leichter Kampfwagen – developed from December 1917 – being also a turret-less tank with the engine in front resembled the Whippet, but was a smaller vehicle with thinner armour.

== Surviving vehicles ==
Five Whippets survive:

- A259 Caesar II, The Tank Museum. This is the tank in which Cecil Harold Sewell won the Victoria Cross.
- A347 Firefly, Royal Museum of the Armed Forces and Military History, Brussels. This tank, part of B-Company, is still in its original paint and markings. It still carries battle damage from when it was hit on 17 August 1918.
- A231. Base Borden Military Museum, Ontario, Canada
- U.S. Army Armor & Cavalry Collection (census number unknown).
- South African Army College, Pretoria, South Africa. This tank was originally dispatched to South Africa to put down labour unrest.
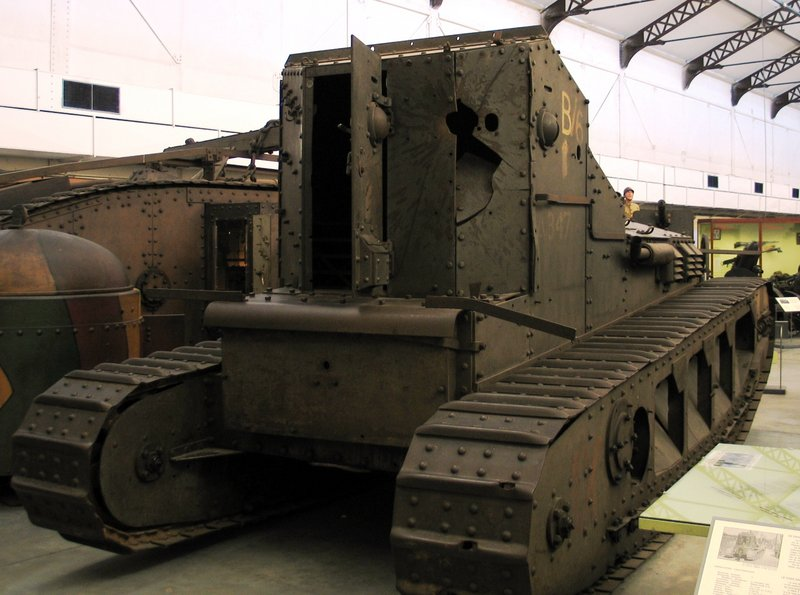
Rear of A347, Royal Museum of the Army, Brussels (2005)

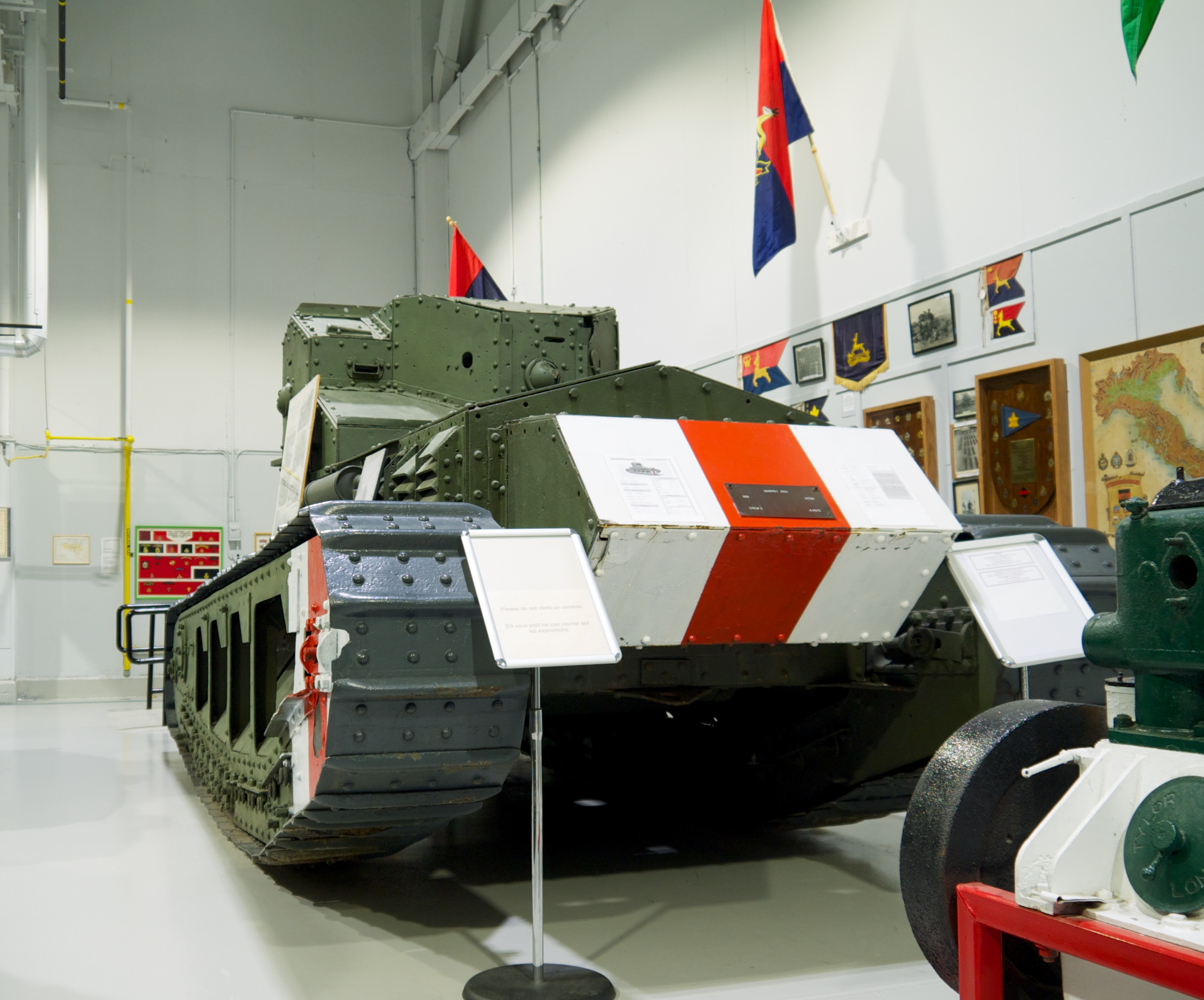
A231. Base Borden Military Museum, Ontario, Canada (2015)

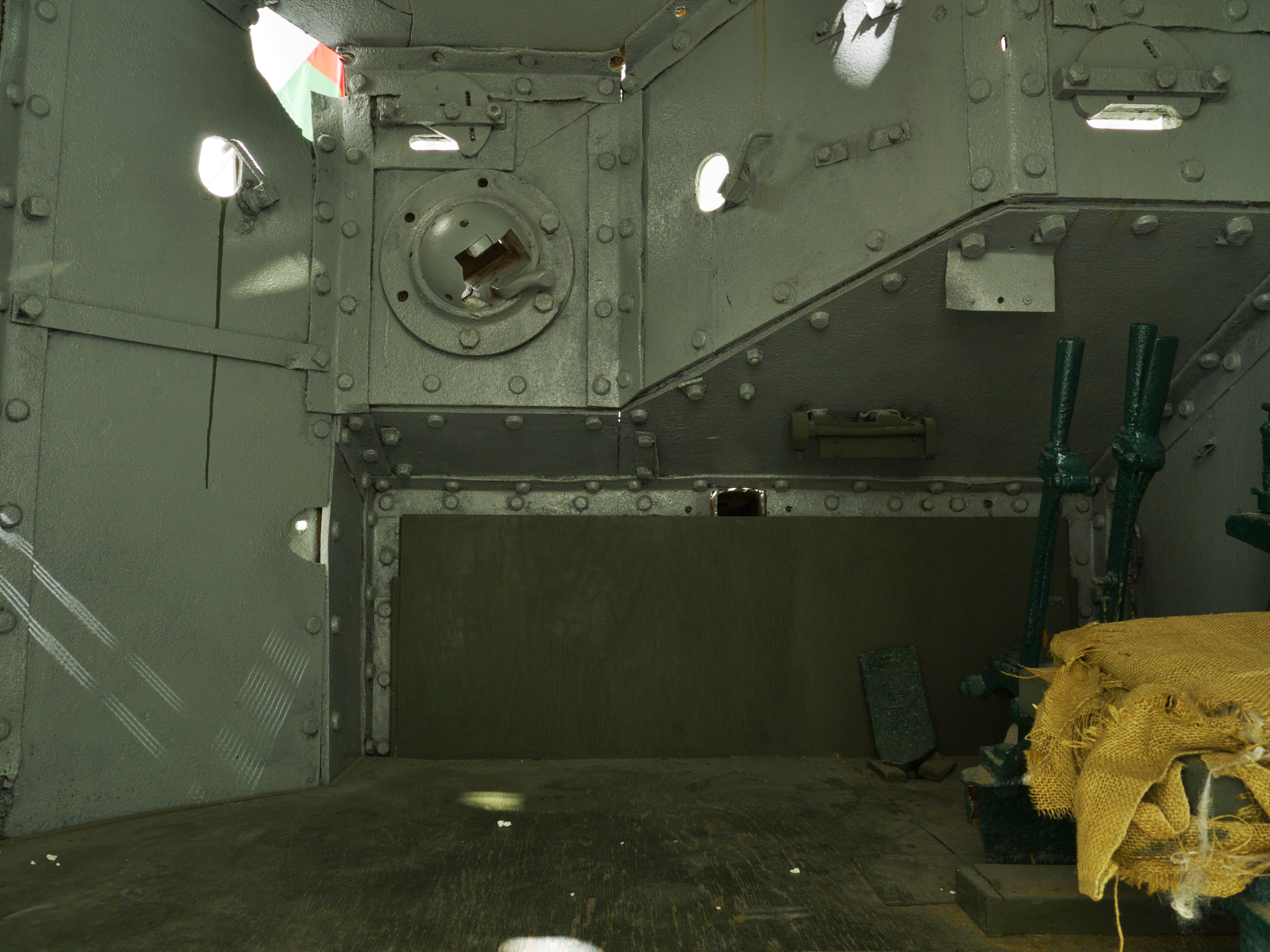
Interior of tank at Base Borden Military Museum (2015)

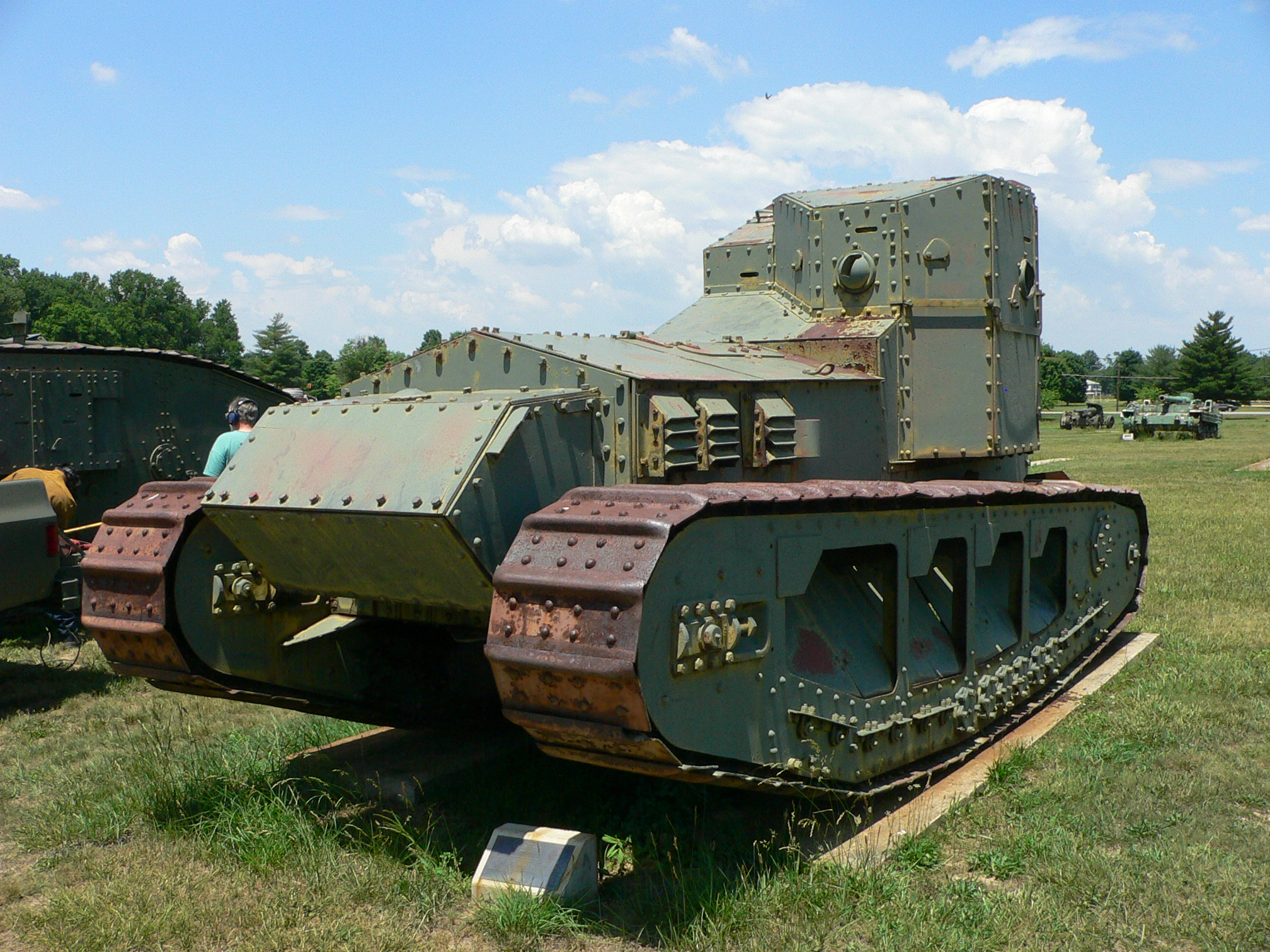
United States Army Ordnance Museum (2007)

== See also ==
- History of the tank – Chronicle of armoured combat vehicles
- Tanks in World War I
- Comparison of World War I tanks
- Light tanks of the United Kingdom
