= Medium Mark C =

Late WWI/early interwar British medium tank

Medium Tank Mark C
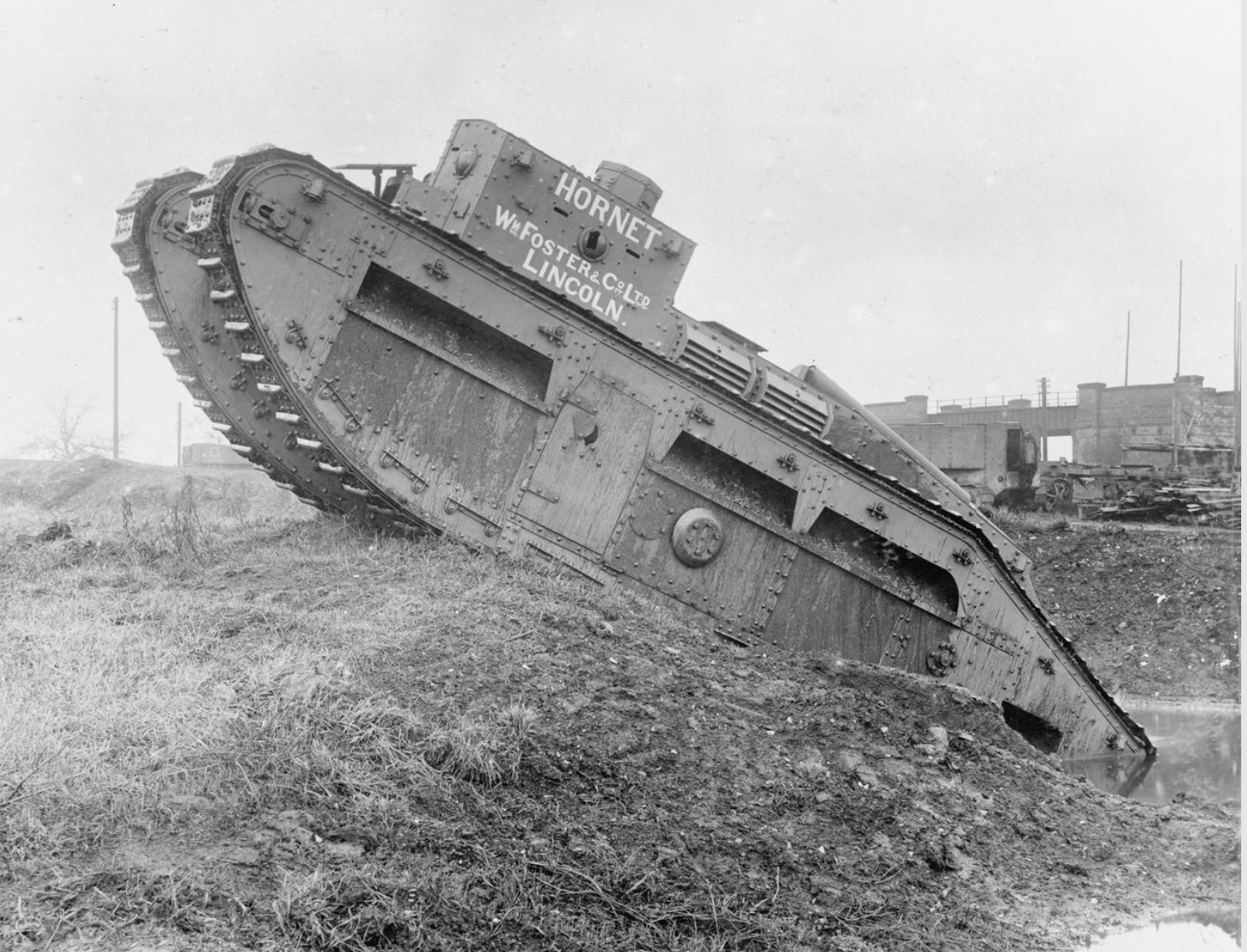
- Medium Mark C
- Type: Medium tank
- Place of origin: United Kingdom

Production history
- Designer: William Rigby
- Designed: 1917
- Manufacturer: Fosters
- Produced: 1918 (August–November)
- No. built: 50

Specifications ('Female')
- Mass: 20 long tons (20 t)
- Length: 25 ft 10 in (7.87 m)
- Width: 8 ft 4 in (2.54 m)
- Height: 9 ft 6 in (2.90 m)
- Crew: 4: commander, driver, mechanic, machine gunner
- Armour: 14 mm (0.55 in) maximum
- Main armament: 5 x .303 (7.7mm) machine guns (Note: White says 4 Hotchkiss machine guns)
- Engine: Ricardo 6-cylinder petrol engine 150 hp (110 kW)
- Power/weight: 7.5 hp/tonne
- Suspension: unsprung
- Operational range: 225 km (75 miles)
- Maximum speed: 7.9 mph (12.7 km/h)
- References: Fletcher 2001, White

The Medium Mark C Hornet was a British medium tank developed during the First World War, but produced too late to see any fighting.

== Development ==
In 1917 Sir William Tritton had developed the Medium Mark A Whippet without involving his former co-worker Walter Gordon Wilson. In response Major Wilson began to design an improved type on his own, the Medium Mark B, in July 1917. As soon as he became aware of Wilson's intentions, Tritton ordered his chief designer, William Rigby, to design a rival type: the Medium Mark C. The drawings were approved by the British Army on 19 April 1918. The prototype was finished in August, a few weeks before the Medium B prototype also in construction at Tritton's own factory. At first 200 tanks were ordered; later this was increased to 600, all to be produced by William Foster & Co Ltd at Lincoln with Armlet & Wortley as subcontractor. Only 50 were built. The colloquial name of the tank was to be "Hornet", but it seems nobody ever used it.

== Description ==
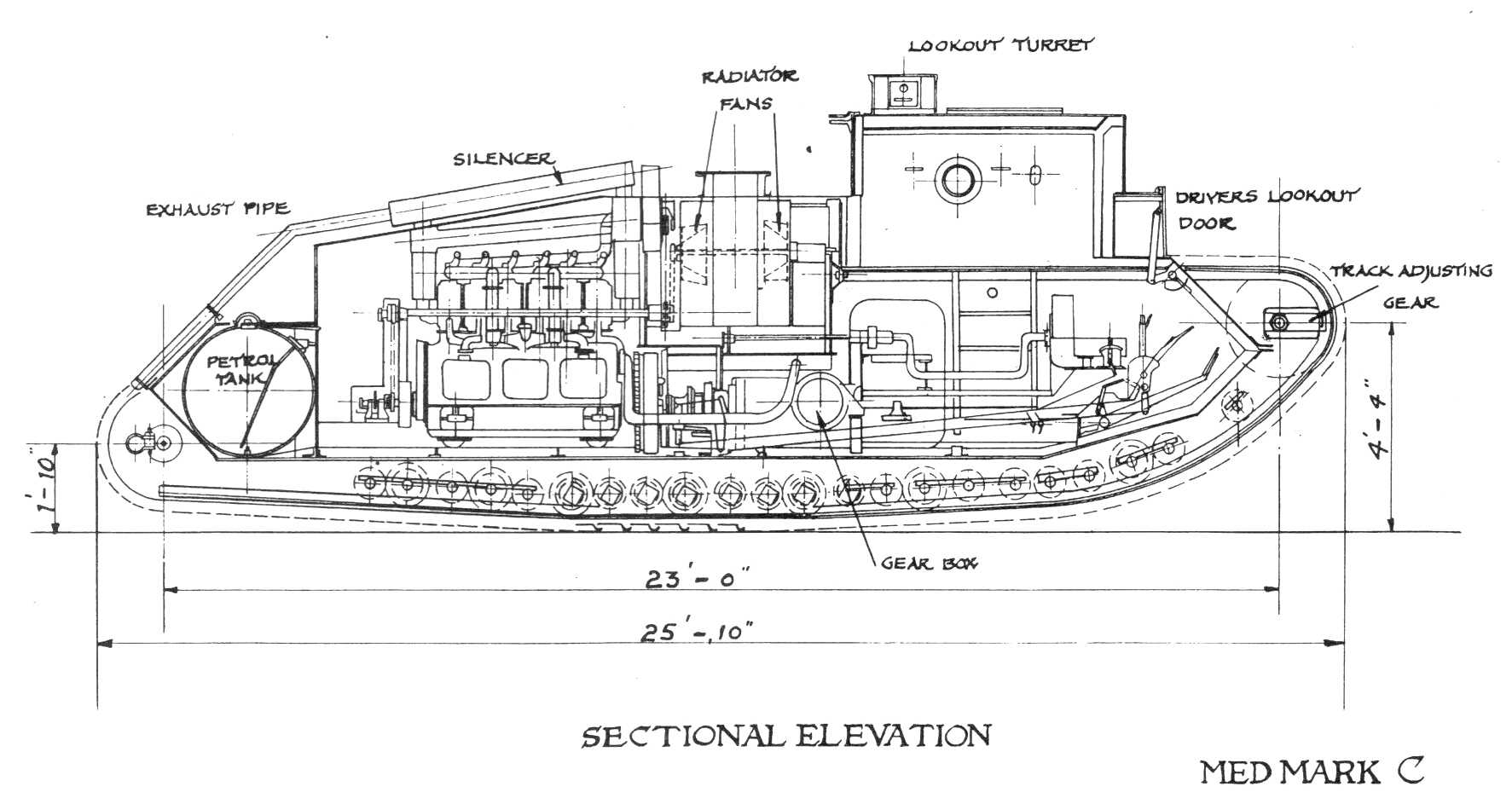
Medium Mark C, cross–section diagram

Superficially, the Medium C looks a lot like its rival, the Medium B. It too has the general rhomboid shape of the Mark I and later heavy tanks combined with a fixed armoured structure, or casemate, well forward, fitted with ball-mounts for five machine guns. However, Tritton's Medium Mark C was a much longer vehicle. It had a separate engine compartment at the back like the Medium B, but here it was large enough to house a normal 6-cylinder Ricardo engine behind a standard (as used in Mark V heavy tank) epicyclic transmission which was connected by chains to the sprockets. Also it was easily accessible from the fighting compartment. The larger engine meant the tank had better speed - about 8 mph (13 km/h). The greater length gave it a superior trench crossing ability. A fuel tank holding 150 imp gal (680 L) of petrol allowed for a range of 140 mi (230 km). Overall mobility therefore was much better.

Rigby had taken great care to improve the design's ergonomics. The commander had a special revolving lookout cupola and even a small map table. There were eleven vision slits. Special stowage boxes were fitted for the personal gear of the crew of four. Speaking-tubes were used to improve communication. The driver had an odometer.

== Operational history ==
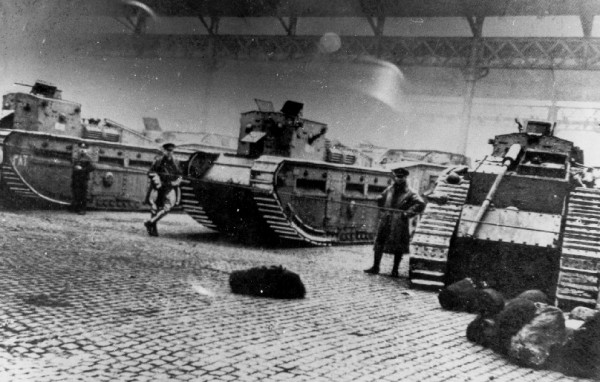
Medium Mark Cs deployed in Glasgow in 1919, following the Battle of George Square

In the (likely) eventuality that the Medium Mark D would not be ready for mass production in 1919, the Tank Corps hoped to receive no fewer than 6,000 Medium Cs that year, a third of which would be of the "Male" version, with a long six-pounder (57 mm) gun, as used on the first British tanks, in the front of the superstructure. Though drawings were prepared, nothing would come of this. When the war ended all orders were cancelled, with only 36 vehicles nearly finished. These were completed, together with fourteen others built from pre-produced parts, for a total production of fifty. General J.F.C. Fuller considered switching the budget for the development of the Medium D to a further production of Medium C's so as to fully equip all peace-time tank battalions with this better tank, but decided against it. Only the 2nd Tank Battalion received the tank. As it was the most modern materiel of the Tank Corps, it was carefully kept from harm: no Medium C's were sent either with the Expedition Forces against the Bolsheviks in Russia or to the Anglo-Irish War. The only tanks participating in the 1919 victory parade were four Medium C's. The only "action" the tank ever saw was being deployed to Glasgow in 1919, where they were parked in the Cattle Market, unused, in case they were needed to control rioting in the city, following the rioting known as the Battle of George Square in 1919.

From 1925 on, the Medium C was gradually replaced by the Medium Mark I and Medium Mark II. Proposals to use Medium Cs as recovery vehicles were rejected. A single vehicle was used to test a new type of transmission. In 1940 the last remaining Medium C was melted down.
