= Vickers Medium Mark II =

British medium tank

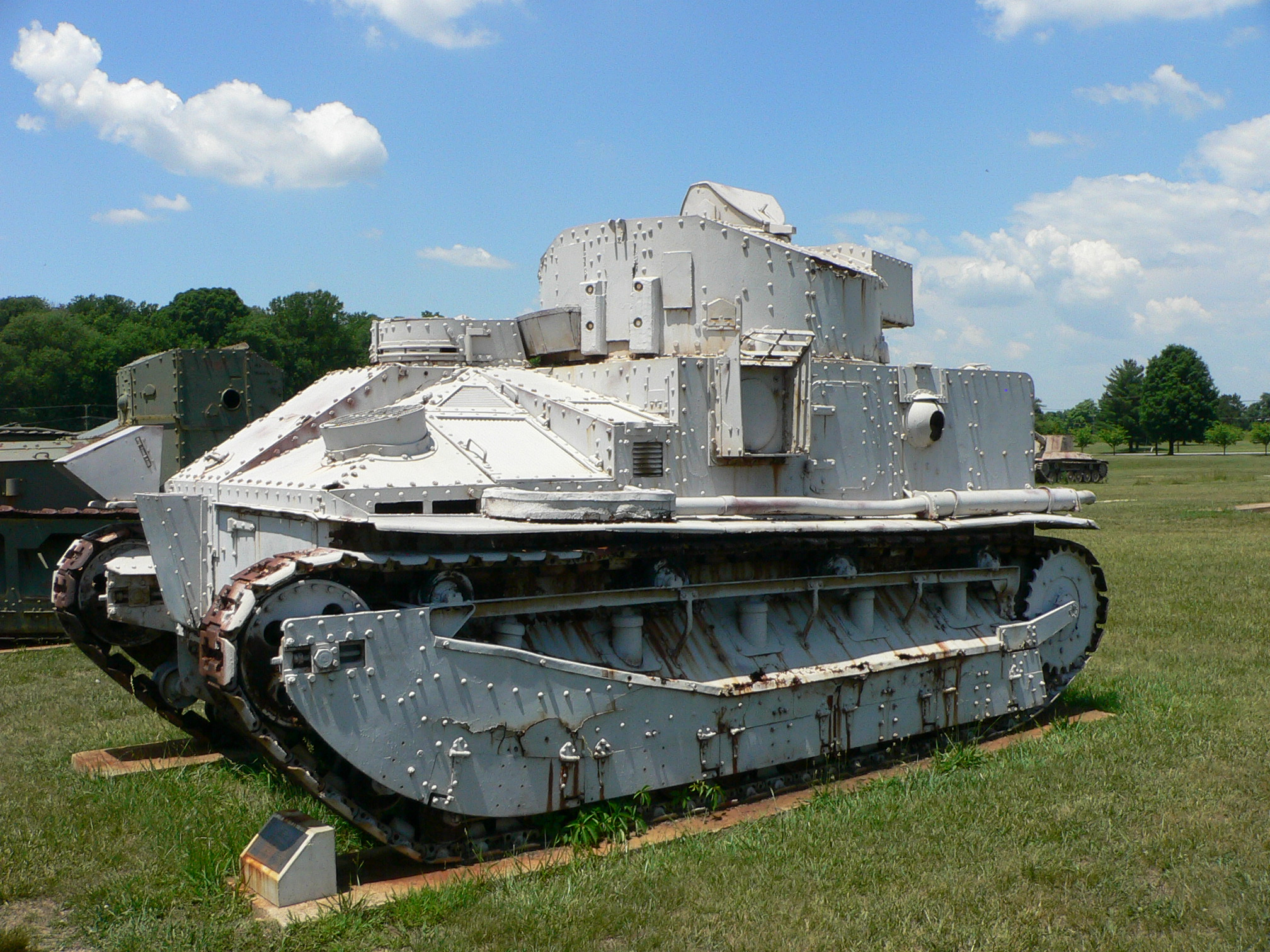
- Vickers Medium Mk.IIA* at U.S. Army Ordnance Museum, Aberdeen
- Type: Medium tank
- Place of origin: UK

Service history
- In service: 1925–1939

Production history
- Manufacturer: Vickers
- Produced: 1925–1934 (including reworking)

Specifications
- Mass: 12.2 long tons (12.4 t)
- Length: 17 feet 6 inches (5.33 m)
- Width: 9 feet 3 inches (2.82 m)
- Height: 8 feet 10 inches (2.69 m)
- Crew: 5
- Armour: 0.25 inches (6.35 mm) to 0.315 inches (8.0 mm)
- Main armament: QF 3-pounder (47 mm)
- Secondary armament: 4 × 0.303 (7.7 mm) Hotchkiss M1909 Benét–Mercié machine gun 2 × 0.303 Vickers machine gun
- Engine: Armstrong Siddeley V-8; 90 horsepower (67 kW)
- Power/weight: 8 hp/tonne
- Suspension: helical springs
- Operational range: 193 km
- Maximum speed: 15.6 mph (25.1 km/h)

The Vickers Medium Mark II was a British medium tank built by Vickers during the interwar period of the First and Second World Wars.

The Medium Mark II, derived from the Vickers Medium Mark I, was developed to replace the last of the Medium Mark Cs still in use. Production and rebuilding ran from 1925 until 1934. The tank was phased out of service from 1939, replaced by the Cruiser Mk I. It featured several improvements over the Vickers Mark I: a higher superstructure with the driver's visor on top of it instead of in front of it; an improved suspension protected by armour skirts; and Rackham clutches, providing a primitive form of mechanical servo-control. Due to a slightly higher weight its rated speed of 13 mph (21 km/h) was slower than the 15 mph (24 km/h) of the Medium Mark I.

== Design ==
The Mark II used the same chassis, suspension and transmission as the Medium Mark I but had a new superstructure. The Mark II was equipped with a 47 mm 3-pdr gun and four machine guns in the turret. The back of the turret had a slope so that the machine gun there could be used against aircraft. There were two Vickers machine guns, one in each side of the hull to the rear.

== Operational history ==
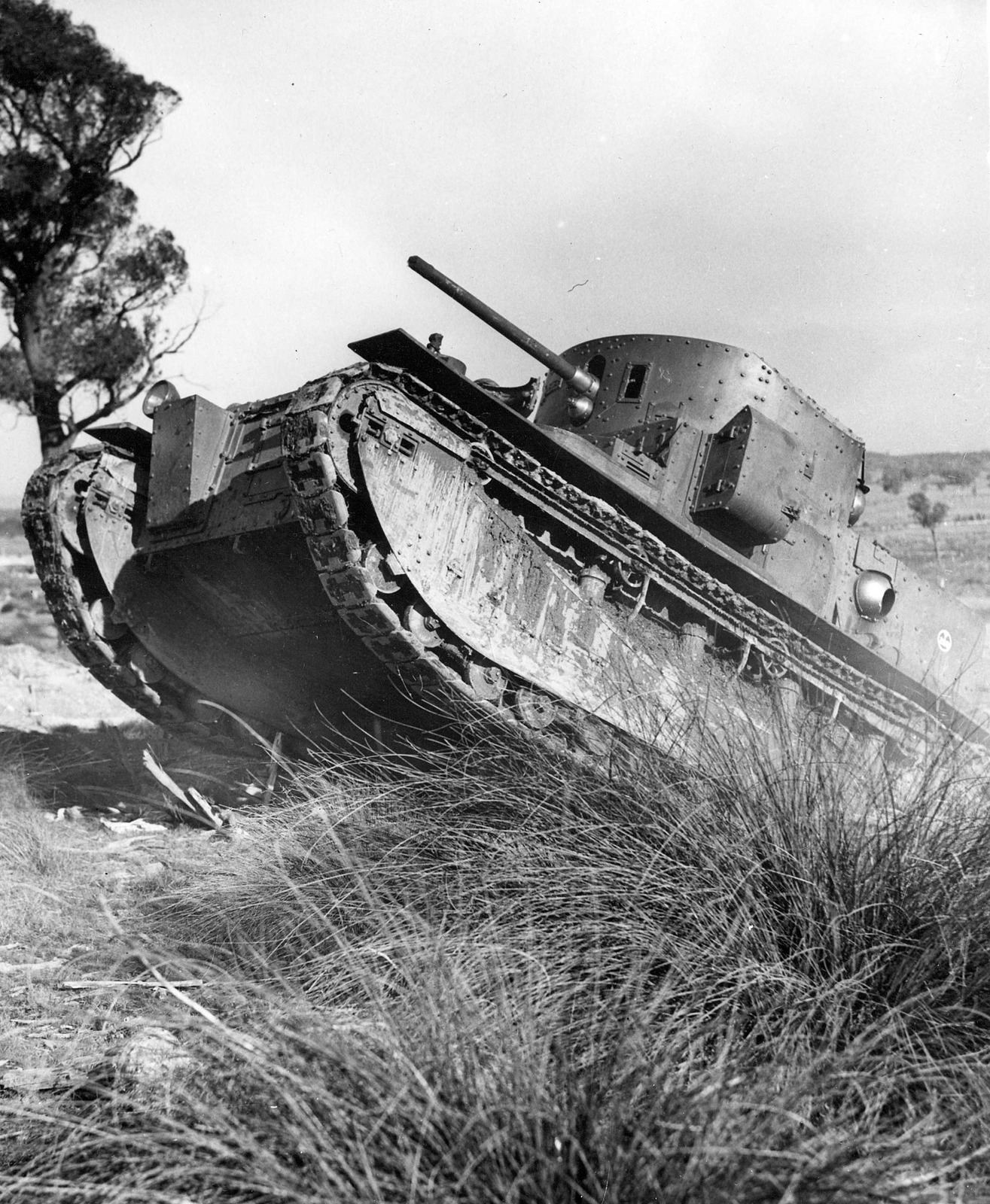
Australian Medium Mark II

The Vickers Medium Mark II and its predecessor the Vickers Medium Mark I replaced some of the Mark V heavy tanks. Both tanks equipped the Royal Tank Regiments until they were phased out starting in 1938. The tanks saw their first combat use when two were used against the Mohmands on the Northwest Frontier of British India during the Mohmand campaign of 1935. In November 1939, some Medium Mark IIs were sent to Egypt for experiments being conducted by Major-General Sir Percy Hobart and his Mobile Division (Egypt), but the Vickers Mediums in Egypt were also phased out before Italy declared war in June 1940. The Mediums were used for initial instruction in driver training.

During the threat of German invasion of the summer of 1940, some of these outmoded vehicles were reactivated for a short time. No "mobile" Vickers Mediums faced the Italian invasion of Egypt in September 1940, but at least one was dug in as an armoured pillbox in the defences at Mersa Matruh at the time of the invasion.

== Variants ==
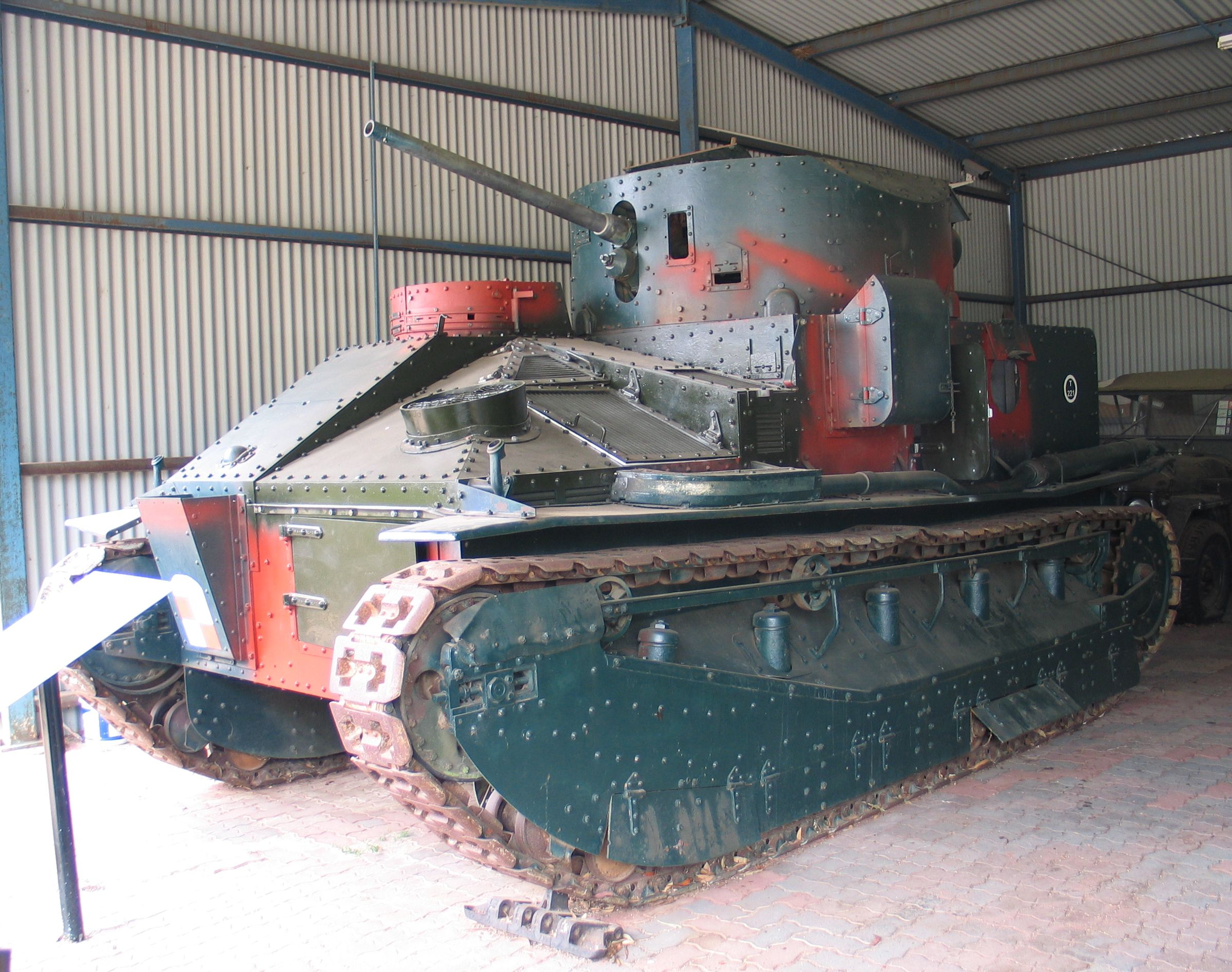
Medium Mark II* Special.

- Mark II: the original version of which a hundred were built.
- Mark II*: Fifty-six of the same vehicles with the Hotchkiss machine guns removed, a coaxial Vickers machine gun added and the commander's post shifted somewhat further back as in the original position he had been in a very real danger of being hit in the stomach by spent shells ejected by the main gun's breech block.
- Mark IIA: Twenty vehicles newly built in 1930. The bevel was removed from the rear of the turret and an armoured electrical ventilator fan added on the left side.
- Mark II**: in 1932 the remaining 44 Mark II's were brought to Mark II* standard; in addition a wireless set was fitted in an armoured container at the back of the turret. the weight rose to 13.5 short tons (12.2 t).
- Mark IIA*: the twenty Mark IIA's brought to Mark II** standard.
- Medium Mark II Tropical: in 1928 five tanks were shipped to Egypt. They were modified by fitting insulation against the heat, such as spaced asbestos plates on the upper surfaces.
- Mark IIA CS: some Mark IIAs were later rebuilt as close support vehicles, their main armament replaced by a 15-pounder 3.7 inches (94 mm) howitzer, mainly intended to give smoke cover, though some HE shells were also carried. Each company headquarters was equipped with two of these vehicles. The weight was increased to 14 tons.
- Mark D : the Vickers Mk. D was a one-off design built for the Irish Free State and delivered in 1929. It had a more powerful, water cooled, rear mounted, 6-cylinder Sunbeam Amazon petrol engine, developing 170 bhp (130 kW) at 2100 rpm. A 6 pdr gun was fitted and as many as four Vickers .303 (7.7 mm) machine guns. The tank was scrapped in 1940.
- Medium II Bridgecarrier: an experimental project to convert any Mark II optionally into a bridgecarrier by fitting the bridge girders to the vehicle together with a contraption to launch the bridge when finished. This proposal was not adopted.
- Medium II Female: Under the command of Lieutenant J.T. Crocker in 1927 two tanks were built for the Indian Government. The turret had no main gun but four Vickers machine guns. Although they were in fact Medium II's and always called that way, their official designation was Tank Light Mark IA Special (L) India.
- Medium II Box Tank: This was a single command tank, converted from a Medium II in 1928, by removing the turret from the fighting compartment and fitting a large rectangular superstructure. Its only armament was a single machine gun in a ball mounting in the front of that armoured box. Two radio sets were fitted: a short range set for tactical communication and a long range one to contact higher levels. The Box tank was first used by a battalion commander and from 1931 by the Brigade Commander.
- Medium Mark II* Special: in 1929 four vehicles were built for Australia with the coaxial machine gun to the left of the main gun and an additional Vickers machine gun in the right side of the turret.
- Medium Mark II* Command Tank: in 1931 another command tank was created for the Tank Brigade by replacing the main armament by a dummy gun, fixing the turret in place and fitting an additional wireless set in the space thus gained.
- English Workman: the nickname given by the Soviets to 15 (or 16) Vickers Medium Mk.IIs purchased in 1931. This variant had no cupola, less pronounced turret bevels, and cowled ventilation fans on the hull sides. About half a dozen were found without engines or guns by Finnish forces near Vidlitsa in autumn 1941 during the Continuation War.
- Birch gun: three prototypes built between 1926 and 1929 of a self-propelled gun for the experiments then conducted in the field of mechanised warfare. The Mark I had the Ordnance QF 18 pounder, The Mark II chassis was lengthened and fitted with a 75 mm gun on a mounting capable of high elevations.

== Surviving vehicles ==
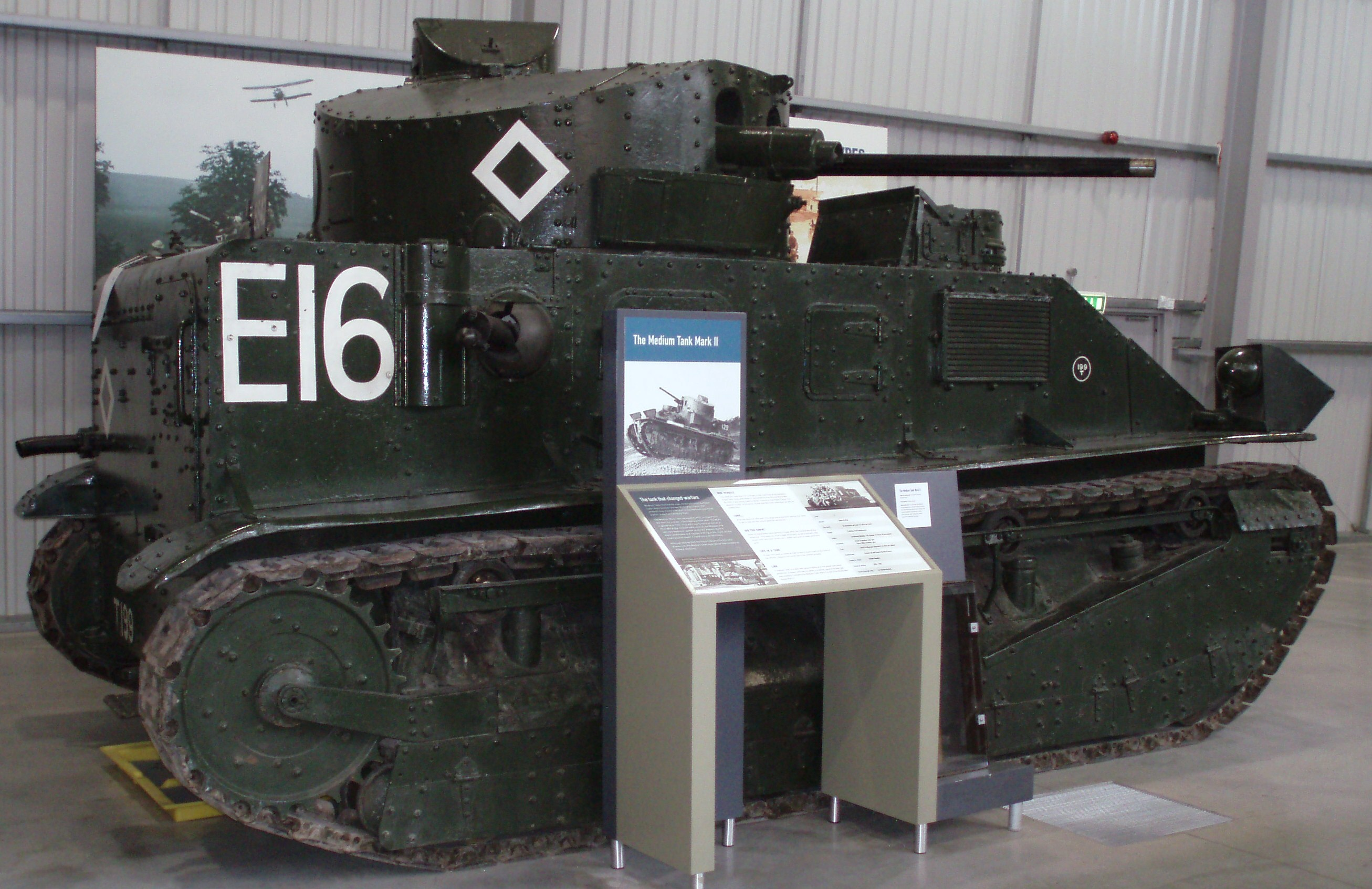
Vickers Medium Mark II at the Bovington Tank Museum

Three Vickers Medium Mark II tanks have survived:

- E1949.330 is preserved at The Tank Museum in Dorset, England.
- U.S. Army Center for Military History Storage Facility, Anniston, Alabama (USA).
- Royal Australian Armoured Corps Tank Museum, Puckapunyal, Victoria Australia.

== See also ==
- Vickers Medium Mark I
- Medium Mark III
