= OQF 3-pounder gun =

Ordnance QF 3 pounder gun Mk I, Mk II
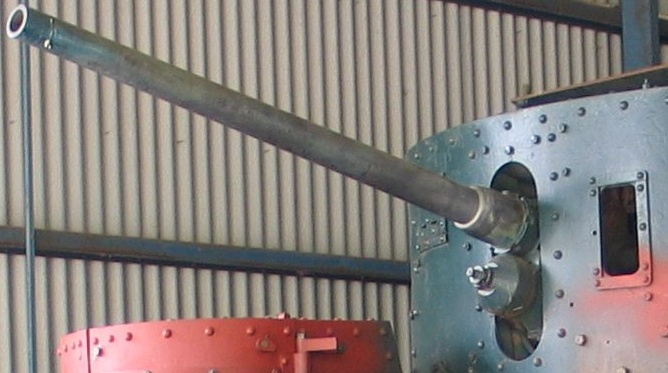
- On a Medium Mk II (special) tank at the Royal Australian Armoured Corps Tank Museum, Puckapunyal, Victoria, Australia
- Type: Tank gun
- Place of origin: United Kingdom

Service history
- In service: 1924–1940
- Wars: World War II

Production history
- Variants: Mk I, Mk II

Specifications
- Barrel length: 1.5 m (4 ft 11 in) bore (32 cal) or 1.88 m (6 ft 2 in) (40 cal)
- Shell: 47x351R. 1.47 kg (3 lb 4 oz) shell.
- Calibre: 47-millimetre (1.85 in)
- Muzzle velocity: 560 m/s (1,840 ft/s) (40 cal gun)

The Ordnance QF 3 pounder 2 cwt gun was a 47 mm British tank gun based on the Ordnance QF 3 pounder Vickers naval gun, mounted on Vickers-built tanks in the 1920s and 1930s. The gun was produced in 31 calibre (59 inch) and 40 calibre (74 inch) versions. In British service the weapon only fired a APHE round, but HE was available to the shortened version fitted to Vickers 6 ton tanks sold overseas.

It was stated in the requirements of the A6 series of Vickers Medium tanks to have the ability to penetrate the armour of contemporary hostile tanks at a range of 1000 yards. The Vickers Medium Mark I was equipped with the Ordnance Quick Firing 2cwt Mark I version of the weapon, whilst from the Vickers Medium Mark II the Mark II version of the 3-pounder was utilized.

Even though other European countries still fielded similar weapons (e.g., Cannone da 47/32) at the start of the Second World War (and quite a few years into it), due to its comparatively low muzzle velocity the 3-pounder was considered obsolete by the war start by the British, with the Ordnance QF 2-pounder replacing it as the standard tank gun of British tanks.

== Usage ==
- Vickers Medium Mark I
- Vickers Medium Mark II
- Medium Mark III
- A6E1
- Vickers A1E1 Independent
- Vickers 6-Ton

== See also ==
- List of tank main guns
