= Battle of George Square =

1919 violent confrontation in Glasgow, Scotland

- Part of Red Clydeside
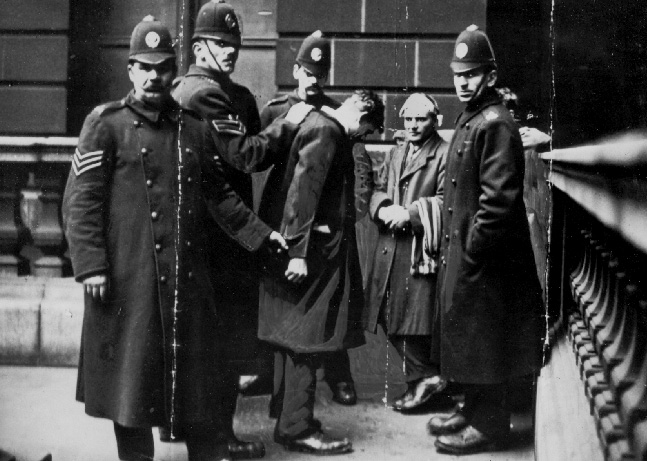
- David Kirkwood and Willie Gallacher being detained by City of Glasgow Police at the City Chambers
- Date: 31 January 1919
- Location: Glasgow, Scotland
- Caused by: Attempts to stop tram traffic in the Square and subsequent action by the police to clear the way
- Result: Rioting in parts of Glasgow; Army units deployed to Glasgow

Parties
Glasgow Corporation; Glasgow City Police	Protesters: Trade unions; Striking workers

Lead figures
Lord Provost Sir James Watson Stewart; Sheriff Alastair MacKenzie	William Gallacher; Emanuel Shinwell; David Kirkwood; Neil Maclean

Number
up to 200 police	20,000–25,000 protesters (not all involved in violence)

Casualties and losses
- Many injured; one police constable died later of injuries received

The Battle of George Square was a violent confrontation in Glasgow, Scotland between City of Glasgow Police and striking workers, centred around George Square. The "battle", also known as "Bloody Friday" or "Black Friday", took place on Friday 31 January 1919, shortly after the end of the First World War. During the riot, the Sheriff of Lanarkshire called for military aid, and government troops, supported by six tanks, were moved to key points in the city, though troops never clashed with the rioters. The strike leaders were arrested for inciting the riot. Although it is often stated that there were no fatalities, one police constable died several months later from injuries received during the rioting.

== Background ==
After World War I, the United Kingdom's demobilization of its military and industry, combined with the increasingly worsening post war domestic fiscal and monetary environment, created the prospect of mass unemployment. The perception that foreigners were taking away jobs provoked ethnic rioting across Britain in 1919, including in Glasgow: in January 1919, rumours that black sailors were "being given the preference in signing on for a ship about to sail", and the belief that they would accept lower wages to do so, led to thirty African sailors being chased through the streets of Glasgow by a crowd of hundreds.

The Scottish TUC and Clyde Workers' Committee (CWC) sought to increase the availability of jobs for demobilised soldiers by striking to obtain a reduction of the working week from a newly-agreed 47 to 40 hours. The resulting strike began on Monday 27 January, with a meeting of around 3,000 workers held at the St. Andrew's Halls.

On 29 January, a delegation of strikers met the Lord Provost of Glasgow and it was agreed that he would send a telegram to the Deputy Prime Minister Bonar Law asking the government to intervene. It was agreed that the strikers would return at noon on Friday 31 January to hear the response. After the meeting, the Sheriff of Lanarkshire contacted the government to ask if military aid would be available to him, if needed, should there be any disorder on the Friday.

The telegram and the Sheriff's request prompted the War Cabinet to discuss the 'Strike Situation in Glasgow' on 30 January

At the meeting, concern was voiced that, given the concurrent European popular uprisings, the strike had the possibility to spread throughout the country. While it was government policy at the time to not involve itself in labour disputes, the agreed action was justified to ensure there was 'sufficient force' present within the immediate locale of Glasgow to secure the continuation of public order and operation of municipal services. The decision to use the armed forces to provide the requested force, in the absence of a declaration of martial law, required those forces be acting on behalf of a civil authority. On the meeting's close, instructions were sent to Scottish Command informing of the situation and to be prepared to deploy government troops if requested.

== Violence between protesters and police ==
On 31 January, a large number of strikers (contemporary estimates range from 20,000 to 25,000) congregated in George Square. They were awaiting an answer to the telegram the Lord Provost of Glasgow had sent to the Prime Minister on behalf of a delegation of strikers on 29 January, asking the government to intervene.

The failure of the tram workers to join the strike and thereby paralyse transport in the city had been a source of growing tension in the preceding days. Some of the strikers tried to stop the tram traffic in the Square. Attempts by the police to clear a way for the trams led to a series of baton charges and growing violence.

As the fighting started in George Square, a Clyde Workers' Committee deputation was in the Glasgow City Chambers waiting to meet the Lord Provost of Glasgow. On hearing the news, CWC leaders David Kirkwood and Emanuel Shinwell left the City Chambers. Kirkwood was knocked to the ground by a police baton. Then he, Shinwell, and William Gallacher were arrested. They were charged with "instigating and inciting large crowds of persons to form part of a riotous mob".

The fighting between the strikers and police, some mounted, spread into the surrounding streets and continued into the night. During the evening, Police Constable William McGregor (who had recently returned to the police from the army) was struck on the head by a bottle thrown by rioters in the Saltmarket; he died of his injuries on 1 June 1919.

== Military deployment ==
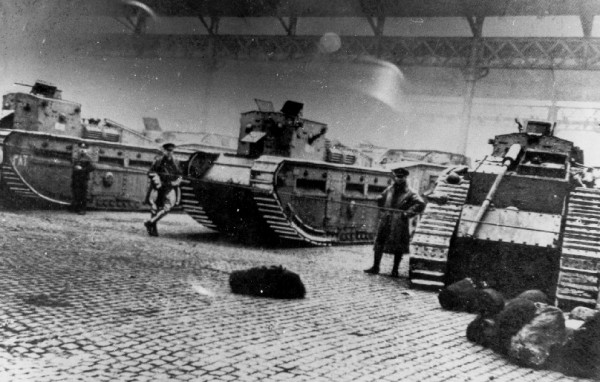
Medium Mark C tanks and soldiers at the Glasgow Cattle Market in the Gallowgate

The events of the day prompted the request for military assistance by the Sheriff of Lanarkshire (Alastair Oswald Morison Mackenzie, 1917–1933) the most senior locally based judge, also known as the Sheriff Principal. The deployment had already begun before the day's meeting of the War Cabinet, which convened at 3pm.

During that meeting, Robert Munro, Secretary for Scotland, described the demonstration as "a Bolshevist uprising". A force made up mainly of Scottish troops was dispatched from bases in Scotland, and one battalion was sent up from northern England. General Sir Charles Harington, the Deputy Chief of the Imperial General Staff informed the meeting that 6 tanks supported by 100 lorries were "going north that evening".

It is sometimes suggested that the War Cabinet ordered this deployment, but this is incorrect: the government lacked the authority to deploy troops against British civilians without declaring martial law, which was not declared. The War Cabinet discussed the issue but the military deployment was in response to the request from the Sheriff of Lanarkshire.

The first troops arrived that night, with their numbers increasing over the next few days. The three Medium Mark C tanks, and three Mark V* tanks of the Royal Tank Regiment arrived from Bovington on Monday 3 February. The Observer newspaper reported that "The city chambers is like an armed camp. The quadrangle is full of troops and equipment, including machine guns."

The military arrived after the rioting was over and they played no active role in dispersing the protesters. The troops guarded locations of importance to the civil authorities throughout the period of the strike, which lasted until 12 February. The troops and tanks then remained in Glasgow, and its surrounding areas, until 18 February.

A common misconception around George Square is that tanks and troops were used against protesters. According to historian Gordon Barclay, no evidence exists to support this assertion.

== Outcome ==
Key members involved in the strike were arrested in the immediate aftermath of the events of the 31st. Only two – William Gallacher and Emanuel (Manny) Shinwell – were convicted, and were sentenced to three months and five months in prison respectively.

Some of those involved claim that this came close to being a successful revolution. Gallacher said "had there been an experienced revolutionary leadership, instead of a march to Glasgow Green there would have been a march to the city's Maryhill Barracks. There we could easily have persuaded the soldiers to come out, and Glasgow would have been in our hands." Most historians now dispute this claim and argue that it was a reformist rather than revolutionary gathering. Gallacher always regretted not having taken a more revolutionary approach to the 40-hour strike and to the events in George Square in 1919, writing afterwards that, "We were carrying on a strike when we ought to have been making a revolution". Shinwell, born to a Jewish immigrant family in London, ran in the municipal elections to the Glasgow Corporation following his release from prison.

In the general election of 1922, the second election held after the passage of the Representation of the People Act 1918, Scotland elected 29 Labour MPs. Their number included the 40 Hour Strike organisers and Independent Labour Party members Manny Shinwell and David Kirkwood. The General Election of 1923 eventually saw the first Labour government come to power under Ramsay MacDonald. The region's socialist sympathies earned it the epithet of Red Clydeside.

== Folklore ==
The Battle of George Square has become part of both left-wing and Scottish nationalist folklore, where it is often couched in explicitly anti-capitalist and Anglophobic terms, and portrayed as "English troops and tanks" being sent against Scottish demonstrators by Winston Churchill. Churchill in fact played no role in the events: he was not a voting member of the five-man War Cabinet, and did not believe that deploying troops to Glasgow was necessary. The troops were only deployed at the request of the Sheriff of Lanarkshire: the War Cabinet had no power to order the deployment of troops against British citizens without a declaration of martial law. The claim that Churchill ordered the deployment of troops dates no earlier than Emanuel Shinwell's memoirs of 1973. Willie Gallacher claimed in his 1936 memoir that Scottish troops were locked into Maryhill Barracks out of fear that they would join the strikers and replaced with English troops. In reality, Scottish Command was ordered to draw troops from across Scotland, and soldiers of the Seaforths, Gordons, Argyll and Sutherland Highlanders, and the Royal Scots were ultimately deployed to Glasgow. There was at the time only one English battalion based in Scotland, from the East Surrey Regiment, at Bridge of Allan. At no point did troops encounter the strikers, nor were shots fired: the troops were used to guard public buildings after the worst of the rioting had passed in order to release police for crowd control.

A photograph taken at the Trongate of a Mark IV tank, surrounded by a crowd that includes soldiers, is frequently misrepresented as an image of a tank at the Battle of George Square. In reality, the photograph was taken in January 1918, almost a year earlier: the tank, Number 113 "Julian", was exhibited during "Tank Week" parades across the UK as part of a war bonds drive. "Julian" attracted considerable interest, and £14 million in National War Bonds and National Savings Certificates was raised from Glasgow, compared to £6.7 million in Birmingham and £4.7 million in Edinburgh.

The Battle of George Square remains highly politicised: as late as November 2018, the website of the Scottish Government agency Education Scotland contained an educational resource titled 'The Road to the Scottish Parliament', which described the Battle of George Square as "an event unique in British history", in which "English troops and tanks" were deployed against demonstrators on the orders of Winston Churchill, and repeated the claim that "Scottish troops already present in Glasgow were locked in Maryhill Barracks for fear that they might join the demonstrators and precipitate a major revolution."

== Bibliography ==
- Heren, Louise; Barclay, Gordon (2023). Tanks on the Streets? The Battle of George Square Glasgow 1919. Barnsley: Pen & Sword. ISBN 978-1-5267-8265-6.
