= Medium Mark B =

Medium Tank Mark B
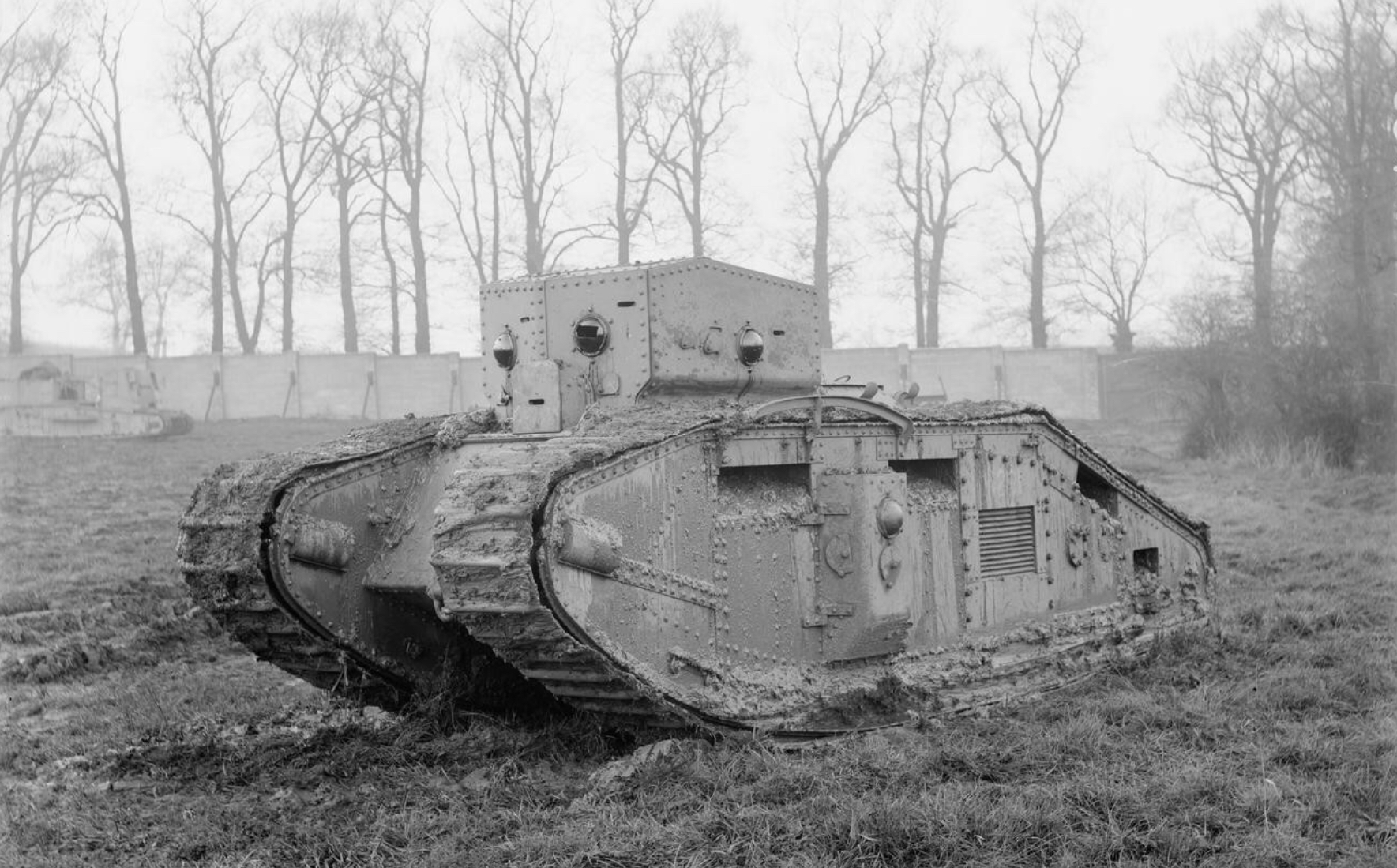
- Medium Tank Mark B. The machine guns are missing from their mounts in the superstructure and in the projecting doors on the sides
- Type: Medium tank
- Place of origin: United Kingdom

Service history
- Used by: United Kingdom; Russian State; Soviet Union (captured)
- Wars: Russian Civil War; Anglo-Irish War

Production history
- No. built: 102

Specifications
- Mass: 18 tons
- Length: 22 ft 9 in (6.9 m)
- Width: 8 ft 10 in (2.7 m)
- Height: 8 ft 6 in (2.6 m)
- Crew: 4: commander, driver, mechanic, machine gunner
- Armour: 14 mm-6 mm
- Main armament: 4 x .303 in (7.7 mm) Hotchkiss machine guns to be placed in seven possible ball-mounts
- Secondary armament: -
- Engine: Ricardo 4-cylinder petrol 100 hp (75 kW)
- Power/weight: 5.6 hp/tonne
- Suspension: unsprung
- Operational range: 105 km or 65 miles
- Maximum speed: 6 mph (10 km/h)

The Medium Mark B was a British medium tank of the First World War developed as a successor to the Whippet. It was ultimately unsatisfactory and production was cancelled at the end of the war.

== History ==
The engineer Lieutenant Walter Wilson and the industrialist Sir William Tritton had cooperated in 1915 to develop the Mark I, the world's first operational tank. However, when Tritton decided to build the Medium Mark A "Whippet", Wilson was left out. The Medium A was designed by Tritton's chief engineer, William Rigby. The Whippet was a successful design and proved effective but suffered from a lack of power, complex steering and unsprung suspension. Wilson, now a Major, decided he could by himself develop a better tank as replacement: the 'Medium Tank Mark B'. He probably started drawing in July 1917. Major Philip Johnson of Central Tank Workshops was impressed when he was shown a wooden mock-up during a visit to Britain late 1917. The prototype was built by Tritton's firm, the Metropolitan Carriage and Wagon Company, and was finished in September 1918.

It seems that early in the design process Wilson considered building an alternative or parallel Male version fitted with a 2-pounder (~40 mm gun) in the superstructure but he had abandoned these plans by March 1918.

The design by Wilson had elements of both the Mark I and the Whippet: a similar but smaller tracked rhomboid chassis of the former and fixed turret like the latter. A novel feature was the separate compartment in the back, housing the 100 hp (75 kW) engine (a four-cylinder shortened Ricardo design) and behind it the epicyclic transmission. Two fuel tanks at the back held 85 imperial gallons (386 L) of petrol. Other innovations were the ability to lay a smoke screen and the use of sloped armour in the front of the hull. The smoke screen device consisted of a sulphonic acid reservoir located over the exhaust pipe. Armament consisted of a maximum of five machine guns in the superstructure and two in the side doors. These hull doors looked a bit like miniature sponsons. The machine guns were removable and in practice fewer guns would have been taken along, the machine-gunner moving his gun when switching position; most sources give an estimate of four.

A production of 450 vehicles had been ordered even before the prototype was finished and this number was now increased to 700, to be manufactured at North British Locomotive in Glasgow and later at Metropolitan, Coventry Ordnance Works and the Patent Shaft and Axletree Company. Confusingly the new tank was to have the same name as the Mark A: "Whippet". Almost immediately after having been taken into use, the type fell from grace for two reasons. Firstly the engine compartment couldn't be easily accessed from the fighting compartment. Repair under fire would therefore have been very dangerous. Secondly Tritton had constructed a rival type: the Medium Mark C "Hornet". This other design had superior speed and trench crossing abilities. Wilson had limited the size of the Mark B to that of a single railway flatcar. The end of the war led to cancellation after 102 were produced out of the first order for 450. Of these only 45 were taken into service by the British Army, the remaining 57 probably going straight to the scrapyard.

After the war the type was quickly phased out in favour of the Mark C. Two vehicles were used by the North Russian Tank Detachment. Both were lost and the Red Army used at least one until the Thirties. The last British unit to have the Mark B in service was 17th (Armoured Car) Battalion during the Anglo-Irish War.
