= Walter Gordon Wilson =

Irish mechanical engineer and inventor (1874–1957)

Major Walter Gordon Wilson CMG (21 April 1874 – 1 July 1957) was an Irish mechanical engineer, inventor and member of the British Royal Naval Air Service. He was credited by the 1919 Royal Commission on Awards to Inventors as the co-inventor of the tank, along with Sir William Tritton.

== Education ==
Walter was born in Blackrock, County Dublin, on 21 April 1874. In 1888 he enlisted as a midshipman on HMS Britannia, but resigned in 1892. In 1894 he entered King's College, Cambridge, where he studied the mechanical sciences tripos, graduating with a first class degree, B.A., in 1897. Wilson acted as 'mechanic' for the Hon C. S. Rolls on several occasions while they were undergraduates in Cambridge.

== Aero engine 1898 ==
Interested in powered flight, he collaborated with Percy Sinclair Pilcher and the Hon Adrian Verney-Cave later Lord Braye to attempt to make an aero-engine from 1898. The engine was a flat-twin air cooled and weighed only 40 lb, but shortly before a demonstration flight planned for 30 September 1899 it suffered a crankshaft failure. Unwilling to let down his backers Pilcher opted to demonstrate a glider, which crashed and fatally injured him. The shock of Pilcher's death, at only 33 years old, ended Wilson's plans for aero engines, though he kept the flat twin concept and used it in the cars he subsequently manufactured which he named Wilson-Pilcher.

== The Wilson-Pilcher Car 1900 ==
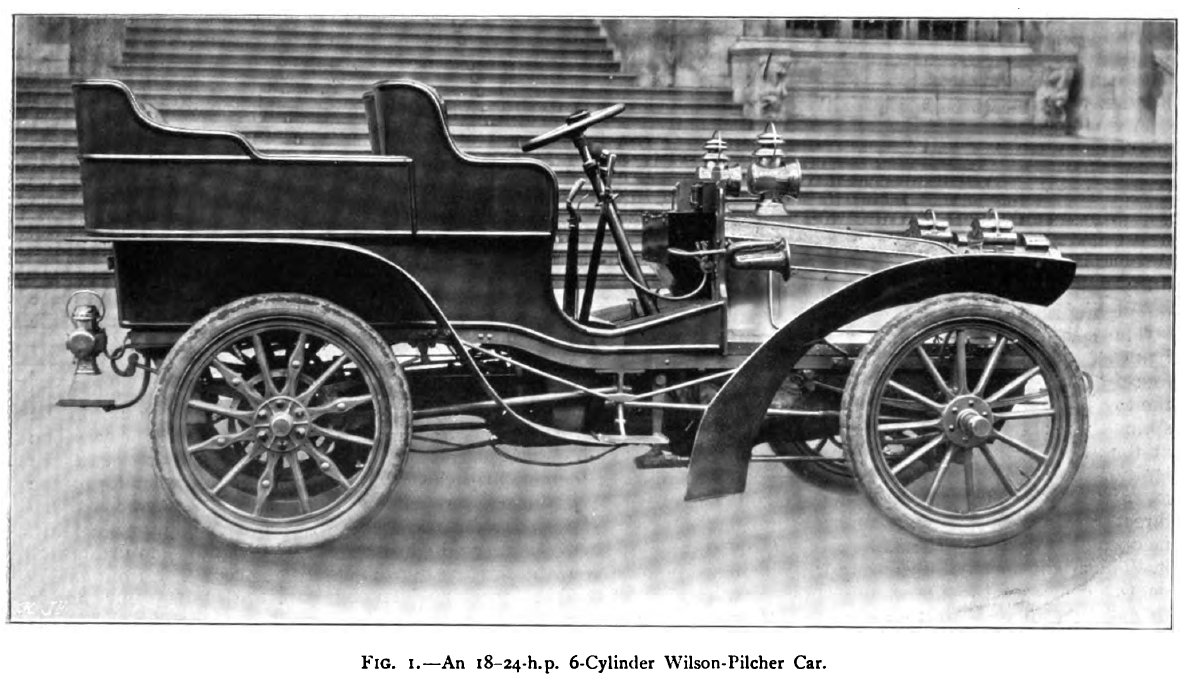
A 1904 Wilson-Pilcher Car

Following the death of Pilcher, he switched to building the Wilson–Pilcher motor car, which was launched in 1900. This car was quite remarkable in that it was available with either flat-four or flat-six engines, which were very well balanced, and with a low centre of gravity making good stability. Each water cooled cylinder was separate and identical for either engine, having 3.75inch (95.25mm) bore and stroke, giving capacities of 2715cc for the four cylinder and 4072cc for the six cylinder. Cylinders were slightly offset with separate crankpins, and the crankshaft had intermediate bearings between each pair of cylinders.

The gearbox of the car was also novel, having dual epicyclic gears and being bolted directly to the engine. This allowed four speeds, with direct drive in top gear. All the gears were helical, and enclosed in an oil bath, making for very silent transmission. Reverse gear was built into the rear axle, as was the foot-operated brake drum, all of which was housed in a substantial aluminium casing.

After marrying in 1904 he joined Armstrong Whitworth who took over production of the Wilson-Pilcher car. From 1908 to 1914 he worked with J & E Hall of Dartford designing the Hallford lorry which saw extensive service with the army during World War I.

The sole known surviving Wilson-Pilcher car is a four-cylinder version that was retained by the Amstrong Whitworth factory and after restoration in the 1940s was presented to W.G.Wilson in the 1950s. It stayed in Wilson family ownership (having been displayed at various museums) until 2012 when it was sold by auction to a private collector.

== Tanks ==
With the outbreak of the First World War, Wilson rejoined the navy and transferred to the Royal Naval Air Service Armoured Car Division, which protected the Royal Naval Air Service personnel in France. When the Admiralty began investigating armoured fighting vehicles under the Landship Committee in 1915, 20 Squadron was assigned to it and Wilson was placed in charge of the experiments. Wilson worked with the agricultural engineer William Tritton, resulting in the first British prototype tank, "Little Willie". At Wilson's suggestion the tracks were extended right round the vehicle. This second design (first called "Wilson", then "Centipede", then "Big Willie", and finally "Mother") became the prototype for the Mark I tank.

Designing several of the early British tanks, he incorporated epicyclic gearing which was used in the Mark V tank to allow it to be steered by a single driver rather than the four previously needed. In 1937, he provided a new steering design which gave a larger turning radius at higher speeds.

He transferred to the British Army in 1916, becoming a Major in the Heavy Branch of the Machine Gun Corps - the embryonic Tank Corps. He was mentioned in dispatches twice and was appointed Companion of the Order of St Michael and St George on 4 June 1917.

== Wilson self-changing gearbox ==
In 1928, he invented a self-changing gearbox, and formed Improved Gears Ltd with J D Siddeley to develop the design commercially. Improved Gears later became Self-Changing Gears Ltd. Wilson self-changing gearboxes were available on most subsequent Armstrong Siddeley automobiles, manufactured up to 1960, as well as on Daimler, Lanchester, Talbot, ERA, AC, Invicta and Riley automobiles as well as buses, railcars and marine launches.

His work on gears was used in many British tanks.

== Death ==
Wilson died on 1 July 1957.
