= List of combat vehicles of World War I =

List of WWI vehicles

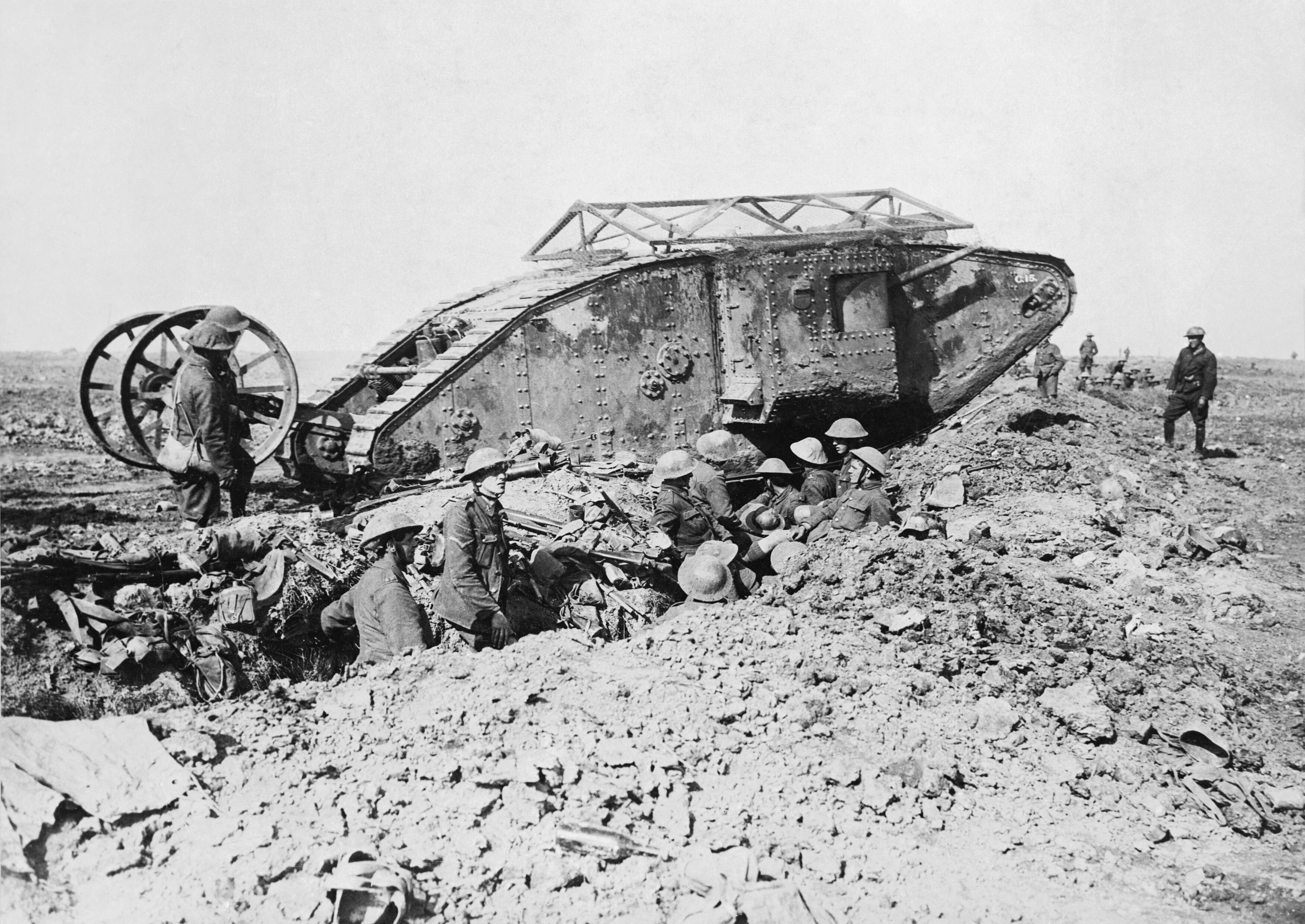
British Mark I male tank

This is a list of combat vehicles of World War I, including conceptual, experimental, prototype, training and production vehicles. The vehicles in this list were either used in combat, produced or designed during the First World War. World War One saw the start of modern armoured warfare with an emphasis on using motor vehicles to provide support to the infantry.

== Key ==
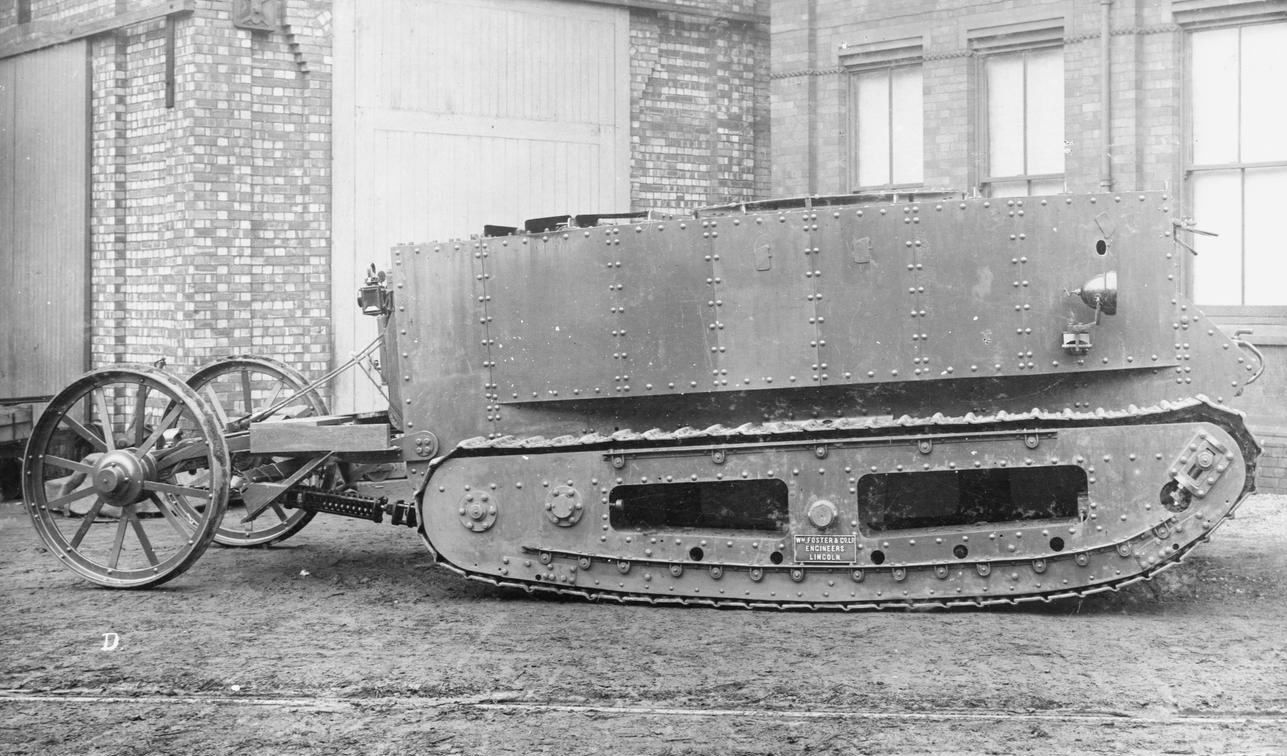
"Little Willie", the first ever completed tank prototype

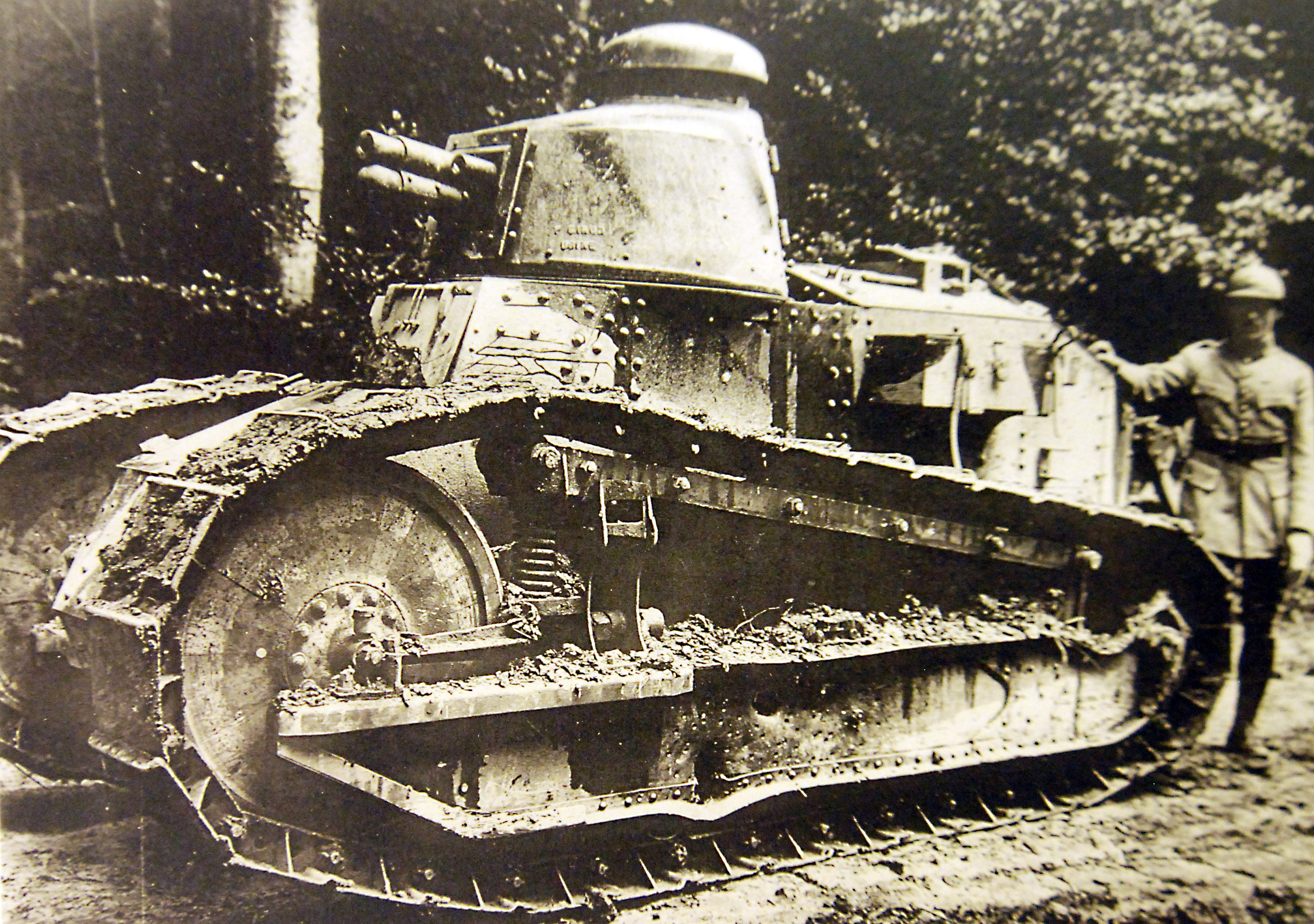
Renault FT, the war's most produced tank

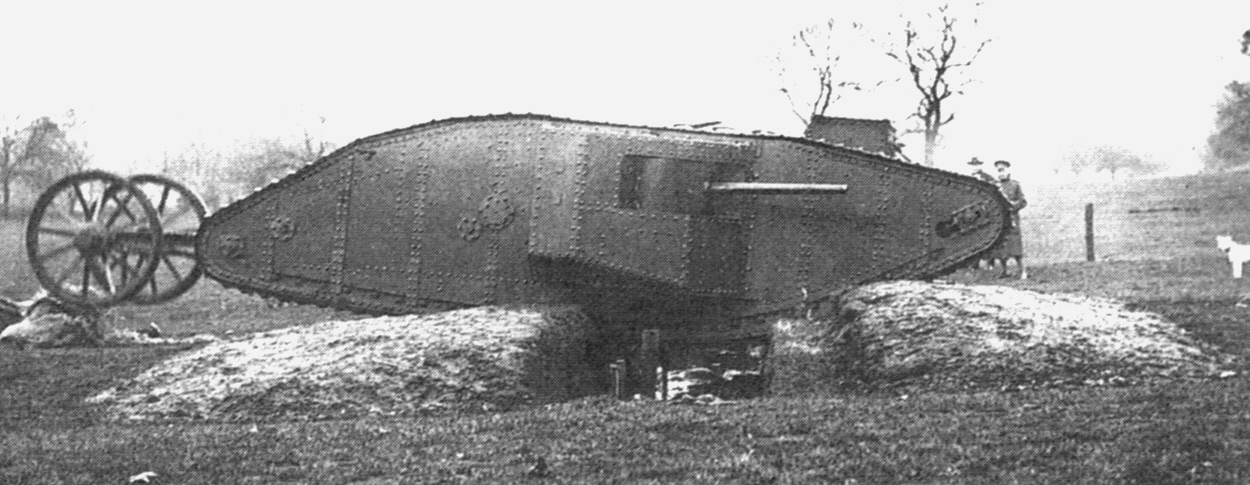
"Mother", the first in the line of British heavy tanks of the war

*	Concept
†	Experimental prototypes
‡	Entered service post-war

== Tanks ==
Tanks came about as means to break the stalemate of trench warfare. They were developed to break through barbed wire and destroy enemy machine gun posts. The British and the French were the major users of tanks during the war; tanks were a lower priority for Germany as it assumed a defensive strategy. The few tanks that Germany built were outnumbered by the number of French and British tanks captured and reused.

France

- Aubriot Gabet tank †
- FCM A *
- FCM 1A †
- FCM 1B *
- Peugeot tank †
- Renault FT
- Saint-Chamond
- Saint-Chamond 25t *
- Schneider CA1
- Schneider CA2 and CA3 †
- Schneider CA4 *

Germany

- A7V Sturmpanzerwagen
- A7V-U-1 Sturmpanzerwagen †
- K-Wagen †
- Landpanzerkreuzer *
- Leichter Kampfwagen I †
- Leichter Kampfwagen II †
- Leichter Kampfwagen III *
- Sturmpanzerwagen Oberschlesien †
- Orion Wagen II †
- Orion Wagen III *

Italy

- Ansaldo Turrinelli armoured tortoise *
- Fiat 2000 ‡

Russia

- Mendeleev tank *
- Rybinsk tank †
- Vezdekhod †
- Vezdekhod II *
- Tsar tank †

United Kingdom

- "Big Willie"/"Mother" † – the single tank "Mother" was the prototype of the British Mark I tank
- Flotilla leader tank *
- "Flying Elephant" * – project for a 100-ton well-armoured tank, not built.
- Foster battletank *
- Kupchak tank *
- No.1 Lincoln Machine/"Little Willie" † – the predecessor to "Mother", single tank built
- Macfie landship *
- Mark I
- Mark II – built for training but some used in France
- Mark III – 50 built for training, only used in UK.
- Mark IV – the most produced British tank
- Mark V – improved engine and transmission, entered service late in war
- Mark VI * – intended improved design with new hull, project cancelled in 1917
- Mark VII †
- Mark X *
- Medium Mark A Whippet
- Medium Mark B
- Medium Mark C ‡
- Medium Mark D † – intended to be a relatively fast tank to take part in "Plan 1919", not developed until after the war.

United Kingdom & United States

- Mark VIII ‡

United States

- CLB 75 Tank †
- Ford 3-Ton M1918 †
- Ford Mark I †
- Holt 200 ton trench destroyer *
- Holt gas–electric tank †
- M1917 light tank ‡
- Skeleton tank †
- Steam tank (tracked) †

== Armoured cars and trucks ==
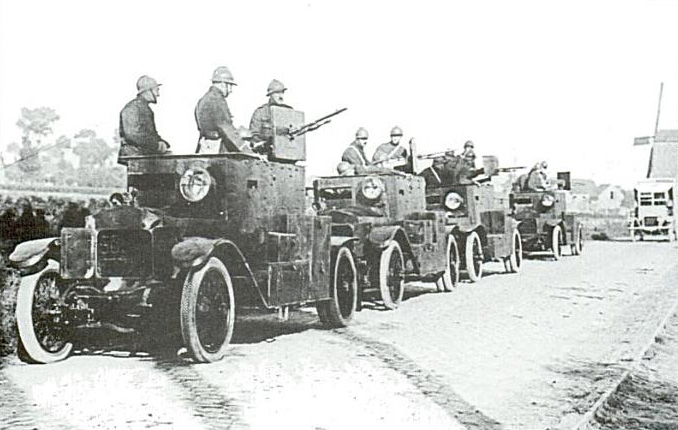
A group of Belgian Minerva armoured cars

Most of the armoured cars of the war were produced by building armoured bodywork over commercial large car and truck chassis.

Austria-Hungary

- Austro-Daimler armoured car
- Gonsior-Opp-Frank armoured car *
- Junovicz P.A.1
- Romfell armoured car

Belgium

- Minerva armoured car
- SAVA armoured car

Canada

- Armoured Autocar
- Jeffery-Russel armoured car

Denmark

- HtK46 armoured car †

France

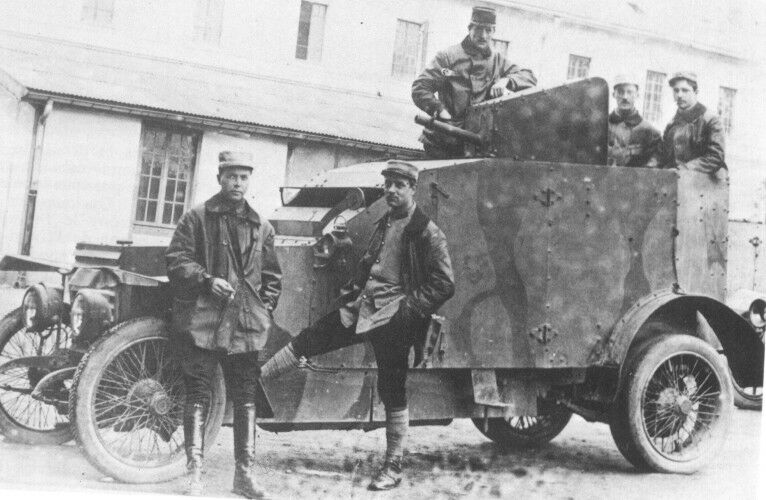
Peugeot armoured car

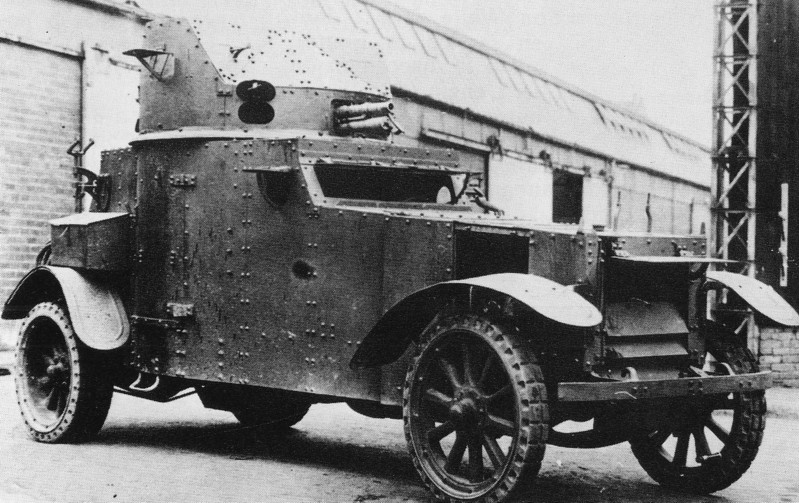
White AM armoured car

- Archer armoured car
- Charron armoured car
- Dion-Bouton armoured car 1914 †
- Dion-Bouton armoured car 1916 †
- Gasnier armoured car †
- Hotchkiss armoured car
- Latil armoured car
- Panhard armoured car
- Peugeot armoured car
- Renault armoured car
- Renault 47mm autocanon
- Vinot Deguinguand armoured car †
- White AM armoured car

Germany

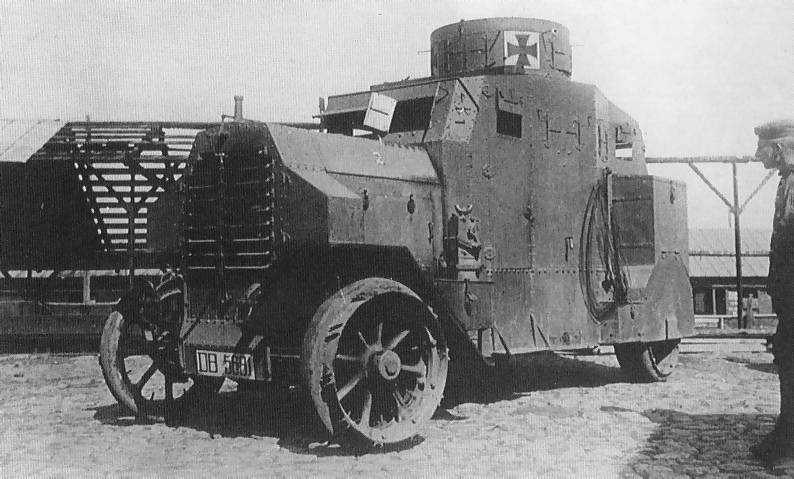
Ehrhardt E-V/4

- Büssing A5P
- Daimler 15
- Ehrhardt E-V/4
- Mannesmann MULAG armoured truck
- Marienwagen II armoured halftrack †

Italy

- Bianchi armoured car
- Fiat-Terni armoured car
- Lancia 1ZM
- Pavesi 35 PS armoured car

Ottoman Empire

- Hotchkiss armoured car

Poland

- Pilsudski armoured car

Romania

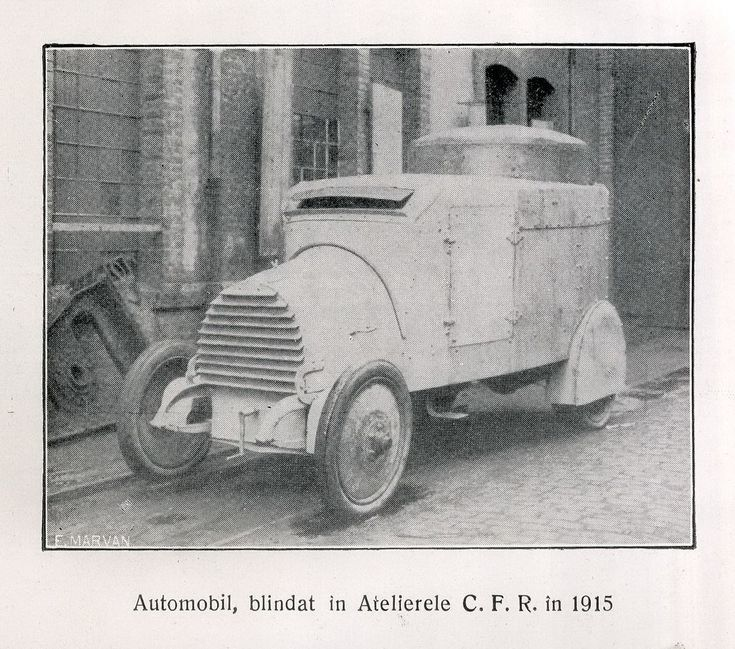
Romanian CFR 1915 armored car

- CFR 1915
- AB M1919 ‡

Russia

- Armstrong Whitworth armoured car
- Austin-Kegresse armoured car
- Austin-Putilov armoured car
- Fiat-Izorski armoured car
- Izorski-White armoured car
- Fiat-Omsky armoured car
- Garford-Putilov armoured truck
- Isotta-Fraschini-Mgebrov armoured car
- Jeffery-Poplavko armoured truck
- Renault-Mgebrov armoured car
- Russo Balt Izorski C armoured car
- White-Mgebrov armoured car

United Kingdom

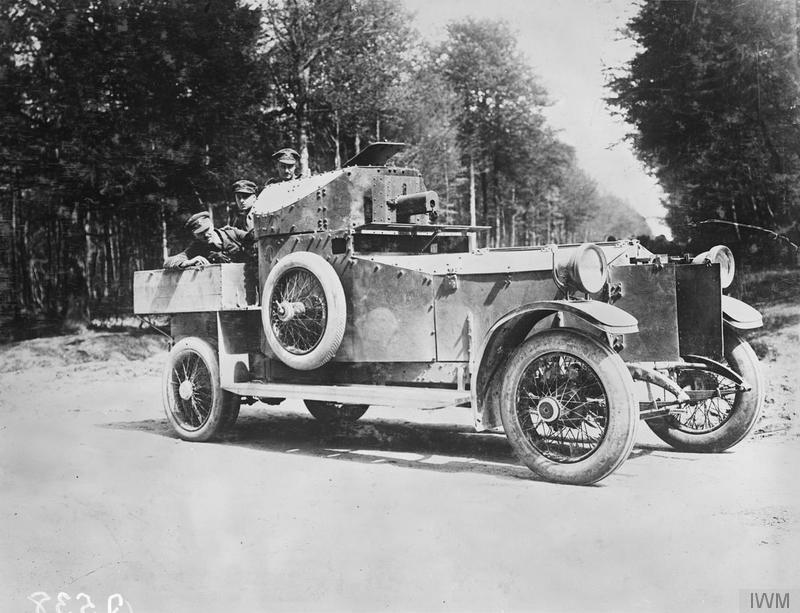
Rolls-Royce armoured car

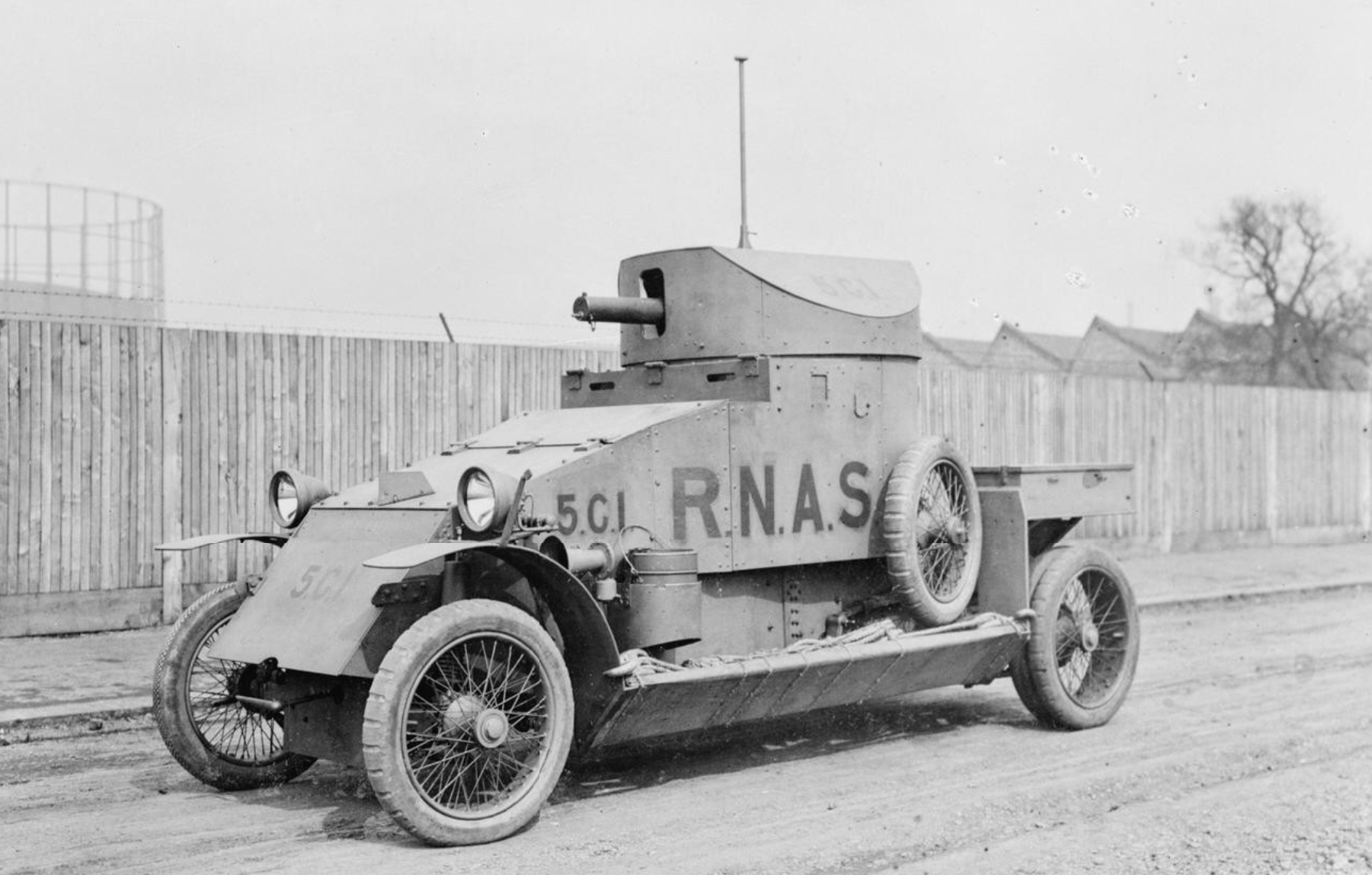
Lanchester armoured car

- AC armoured car †
- Austin armoured car
- Delaunay-Belleville armoured car
- Ford FT-B
- Isotta-Fraschini armoured car
- Lanchester armoured car
- Leyland armoured lorry
- Peerless armoured car
- Peerless armoured lorry
- Pierce-Arrow armoured lorry
- Rolls-Royce armoured car
- Seabrook armoured lorry
- Sheffield-Simplex armoured car
- Sizaire-Berwick wind wagon †
- Talbot armoured car
- Wolseley armoured car
- Wolseley CP armoured car

United States

- Davidson-Cadillac armored car
- King armored car
- Mack armored car †
- White armored car

== Self-propelled artillery ==
France

- Canon de 75 antiaérien on De Dion-Bouton truck
- Renault FT 75 BS
- Renault FT self-propelled gun †
- Renault FT STA self-propelled gun †
- Renault FT STAV self-propelled gun †
- Saint Chamond 120mm L self-propelled cannon †
- Saint Chamond 155mm GPF self-propelled cannon †
- Saint Chamond 194mm GPF self-propelled gun ‡ - 50 built from April 1918
- Obusier 220mm de St Chamond sur affût-chenilles St Chamond † - 1 built and tested in July 1918
- Saint Chamond 280mm TR self-propelled mortar ‡
- Canon de 220mm L Mle1917 Schneider † - 1 built

Germany

- A7V Flakpanzer †
- Leichte Kraftwagengeschutze 7.7cm L-27 flak

Italy

- Lancia 1Z 75-27 autocannone
- SPA 9000C 102-35 autocannone

Russia

- Russo Balt T 76mm AA gun

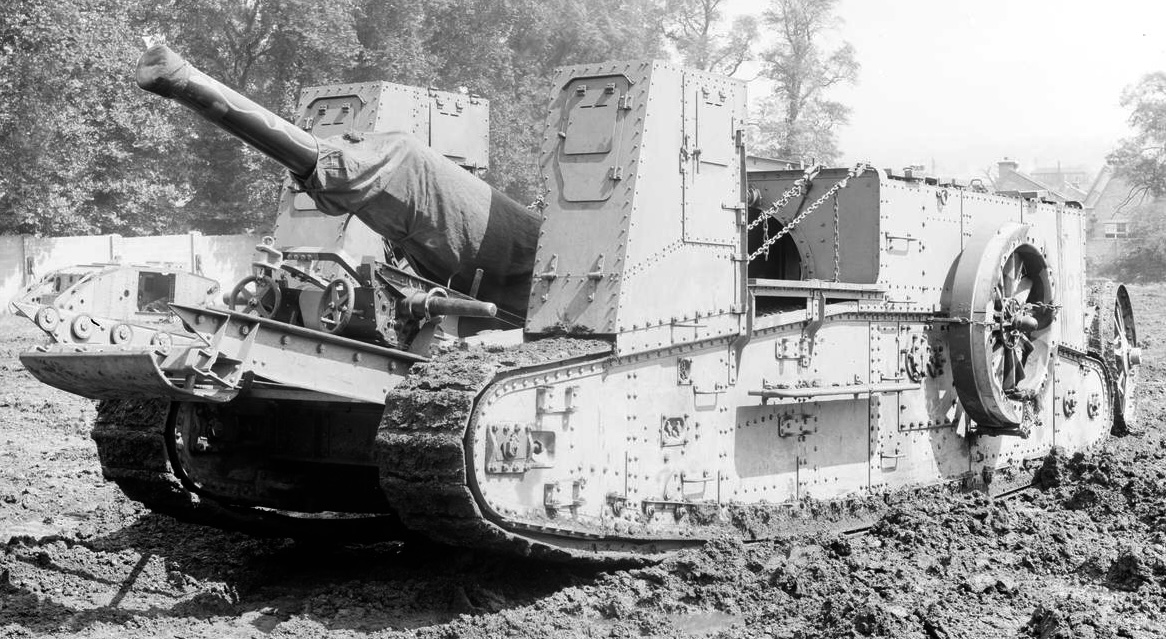
The Gun Carrier Mark I could transport a British field gun over difficult ground but in practice were used more for carrying supplies

United Kingdom

- Emplacement Destroyer No. 1, 1A, 2 & 3 *
- Gun Carrier Mark I - carrier based on Mark I tank for 6-inch howitzer or 60-pdr gun.
- Peerless armoured AA lorry
- Pierce-Arrow armoured AA lorry - 40mm QF 2-pounder gun on lorry chassis
- QF 13-pounder 6 cwt AA gun on Thornycroft J lorry

United States

- Holt 55-1 3-inch AA gun † - delivered in 1917
- Holt Mark I (8-inch howitzer) † - 3 built and tested in 1918
- Holt Mark II (155mm M1918 gun) †
- Holt Mark III (240mm howitzer) †
- Holt Mark IV (240mm howitzer) †
- Christie 3-inch AA gun †
- Christie 8-inch self-propelled howitzer †

== Armoured trains ==
Austria-Hungary

- MAVAG Typ AE panzerzug

Belgium

- Light armoured train

Belgium & United Kingdom

- Heavy "Anglo-Belgian" armoured train

Germany

- Deutsches Heer armoured train

Russia

- Zaamurets armoured train

South Africa

- South African Engineer Corps armoured train

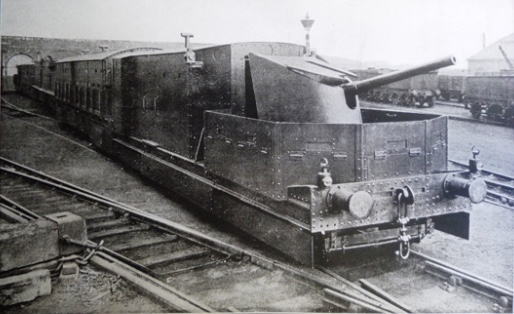
The LNWR built two armoured trains for the defence of the east coast of England

United Kingdom

- GNR(I) armoured train
- LNWR armoured train ("Norma" and "Alice")
- Royal Navy armoured train
- Simplex armoured train
- Uganda Railway armoured train

== Other vehicles ==
Canada

- Saczeany tank *

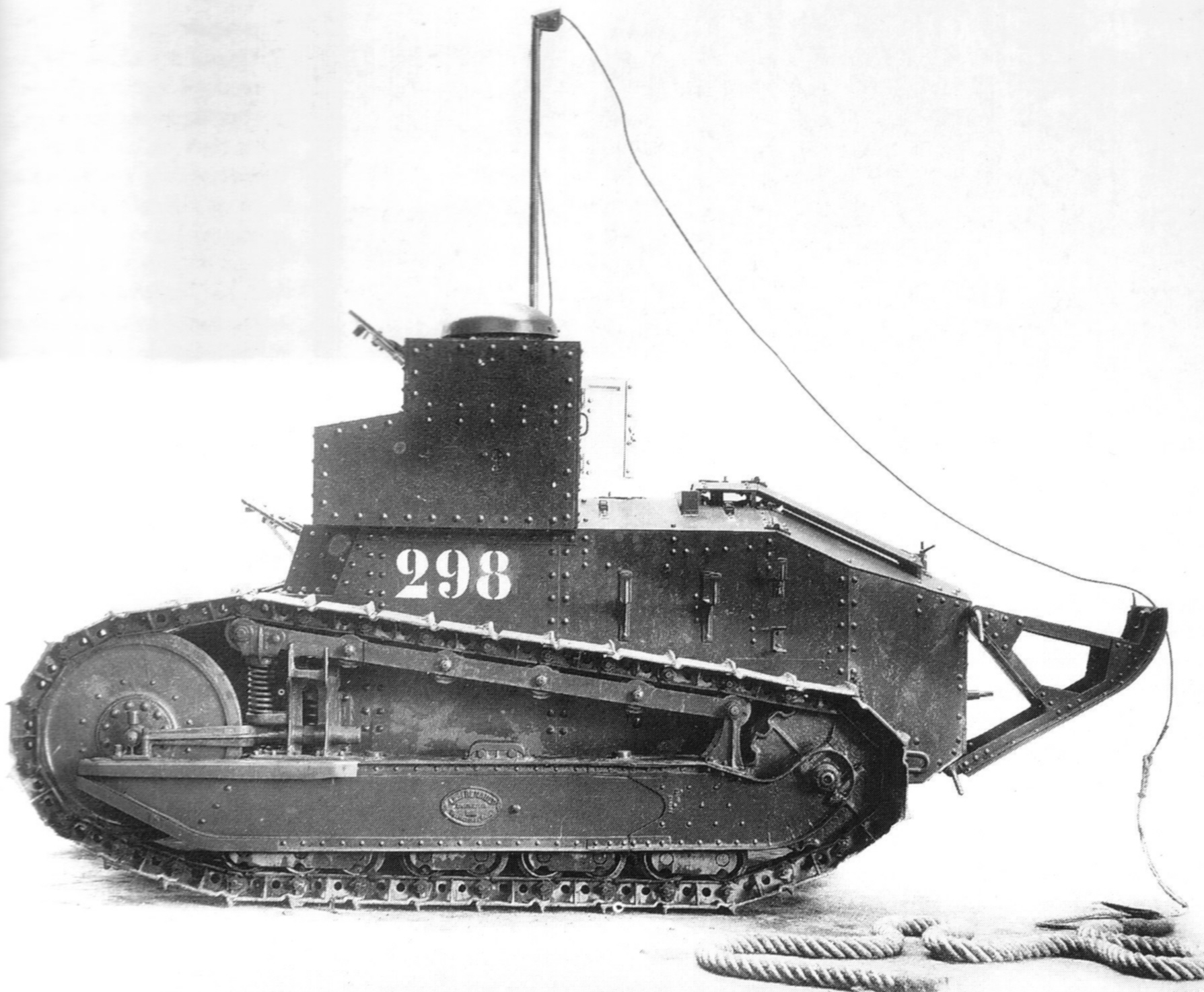
The Renault FT TSF carried a wireless telegraph set but no armament

France

- Aubriot Gabet armoured tractor †
- Boirault machine I and II †
- Breton-Prétot machine (armed tractor) †
- Frot-Turmel-Laffly landship †
- Renault FT TSF (radio tank)
- Souain armoured tractor †

Germany

- Marienwagen I †
- Orion Wagen I †
- Treffas Wagen †

Italy

- Gussalli assault car †

Russia

- Tsar "tank" †

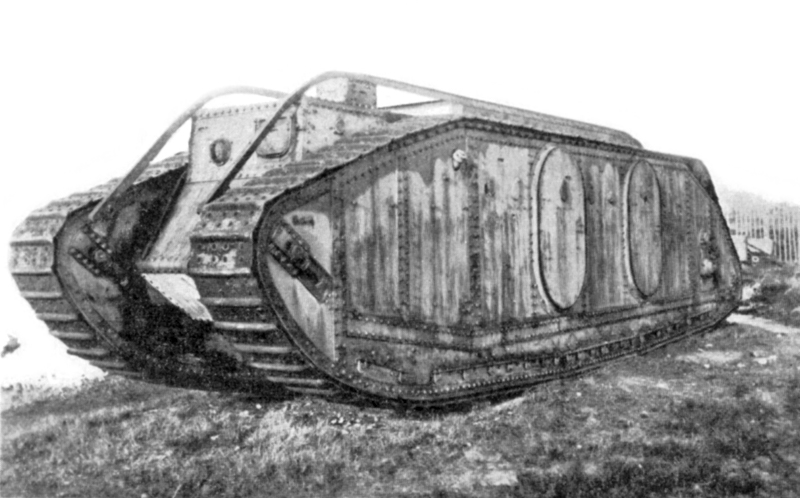
Mark IX, the world's first specialised armoured personnel carrier

United Kingdom

- AEC B type armoured lorry
- Gun Carrier Mark II *
- Killen-Strait armoured tractor †
- Mark I converted to supply tank
- Mark I fitted with wireless communications
- Mark IX
- Pedrail Machine †
- Salvage Machine

United States

- Holt 150 ton field monitor *
- Holt G9 armored tractor †
- Steam Wheel "tank" †
- Studebaker supply tank †

== See also ==
- List of armoured fighting vehicles
- Lists of World War I topics
- Military technology during World War I and the interwar years
- Technology during World War I

== Bibliography ==
- B, David, Tank Encyclopedia, Beauharnois, Quebec, Canada
- Baryatinsky, M.; Kolomiets, M. (2000). Armoured cars of the Russian army 1906-1917 (in Russian). Moscow: Technique-Youth.
- Bishop, Chris (2006). The Encyclopedia of Tanks & Armoured Fighting Vehicles. Hoo, nr Rochester: Grange Books. ISBN 978-1-84013-907-5.
- Bishop, Chris (2002). The Encyclopedia of Weapons of World War II. London: Amber Books. ISBN 1-58663-762-2.
- Bishop, Chris (2014). The Illustrated Encyclopedia of Weapons of World War I. London: Amber Books. ISBN 978-1-78274-141-1.
- Bullock, David; Deryabin, Alexander (2003). Armored Units of the Russian Civil War: White and Allied. New Vanguard. Oxford: Osprey Publishing. ISBN 9781841765440.
- Clelland, Charlie, Landships II
- Duncan, Major General N. W. (1970). AFV Profile 9: Early Armoured Cars. London: Profile Publications.
- Fleischer, Wolfgang (2015). German Artillery: 1914-1918. Barnsley: Pen & Sword Books Limited. ISBN 9781473823983.
- Fletcher, David (2016). British Battle Tanks: World War I to 1939. Oxford: Osprey Publishing. ISBN 9781472817563.
- Fletcher, David (2004). British Mark I Tank 1916. New Vanguard. Oxford: Osprey Publishing. ISBN 9781841766898.
- Fletcher, David (2001). The British Tanks 1915 - 19. The Crowood Press. ISBN 1861264003.
- Forty, George; Livesey, Jack (2006). The World Encyclopedia of Tanks and Armoured Fighting Vehicles. London: Anness Publishing Ltd. ISBN 978-0754833512.
- Forty, George (1984). A Photo History of Tanks in Two World Wars. Poole: Blandford Press.
- Foss, Christopher F. (2002). The Encyclopedia of Tanks & Armoured Fighting Vehicles. London: Amber Books. ISBN 978-1905704-44-6.
- Gale, Tim (2016). The French Army's Tank Force and Armoured Warfare in the Great War: The Artillerie Spéciale. New York: Routledge. ISBN 9781317031338.
- Gougaud, Alain (1987). L'Aube de la Gloire, Les Autos-Mitrailleuses et les Chars Français pendant la Grande Guerre. Issy les Moulineaux: Societe OCEBUR. ISBN 2-904255-02-8.
- Harris, Toby, Tank Encyclopedia, Beauharnois, Quebec, Canada
- Hills, Andrew, Tank Encyclopedia, Beauharnois, Quebec, Canada
- History of World War I. Vol. 3. New York: Marshall Cavendish. 2002. ISBN 9780761472346.
- Hutchins, Ray (2005). Tanks and Other Fighting Vehicles. New York: Random House. ISBN 978-0-517-22985-9.
- Jackson, Robert (2010). Tanky a další vojenská vozidla. Praha: Grada Publishing. ISBN 9788024734668.
- Kempf, Peter. "Landships II". Landships.
- Knighton, Andrew, War History Online, Timera Inc.
- Lepage, Jean-Denis G. G. (2014). German Military Vehicles of World War II: An Illustrated Guide to Cars, Trucks, Half-Tracks, Motorcycles, Amphibious Vehicles and Others. Jefferson, North Carolina: McFarland & Co. Ltd. ISBN 9780786462520.
- Lucian, Stan, Tank Encyclopedia, Beauharnois, Quebec Province, Canada
- Magnuski, Janusz (1993). Samochody pancerne Wojska Polskiego 1918-1939. Warszawa: WiS. ISBN 83-86028-00-9.
- Martinez, Maximino Argüelles (2014). Russian and Soviet Tanks 1914-1941. Maximino Argüelles. ISBN 9781291749540.
- Malmassari, Paul (2016). Armoured Trains. Barnsley: Seaforth Publishing. ISBN 9781848322653.
- Malmassari, Paul (March 2010). "Les chars de la Grande Guerre". 14-18, le Magazine de la Grande Guerre (in French) (48). Saint-Cloud: Soteca. ISSN 1627-6612.
- Milsom, John (1971). Russian tanks, 1900-1970. Harrisburg, Pa.: Stackpole Books.
- Misner, Antoine (administrator), Chars français sur le net, Roubaix
- Moore, Craig. Tank Encyclopedia. Beauharnois, Quebec Province, Canada.
- Pugnani, Angelo (1951). Storia della motorizzazione militare italiana (in Italian). Stab. poligrafico Roggero & Tortia.
- Rigsby, Tim, Landships II
- Sautin, Eugene, Landships II
- Stone, David (2015). The Kaiser's Army: The German Army in World War One. London: Bloomsbury Publishing. ISBN 9781844862924.
- Strasheim, Rainer, Landships II
- Todd, Roger, Landships II
- White, Brian Terrance (1970). British Tanks and Fighting Vehicles, 1914-1945. Shepperton, Surrey: Ian Allan Ltd.
- Zaloga, Steven J. (2017). Early US Armor: Tanks 1916–40. New Vanguard. London: Osprey Publishing Ltd. ISBN 9781472818096.
- Zaloga, Steven J. (2011). French Tanks of World War I. New Vanguard. London: Osprey Publishing Ltd. ISBN 9781780962139.
- Zaloga, Steven J. (2014). French Tanks of World War II (1): Infantry and Battle Tanks. New Vanguard 209. London: Osprey Publishing Ltd. ISBN 9781782003892.
- Zaloga, Steven J. (2006). German Panzers 1914–18. New Vanguard. Oxford: Osprey Publishing. ISBN 9781472801760.
