= SA18 =

SA-18 or SA 18 may refer to as:

- Puteaux SA 18 - a French semi-automatic 37 mm cannon, used from World War I onward
- SA-18 Grouse - NATO reporting name for Soviet 9K38 Igla surface-to-air missile
