= Peugeot armoured car =

French armoured car

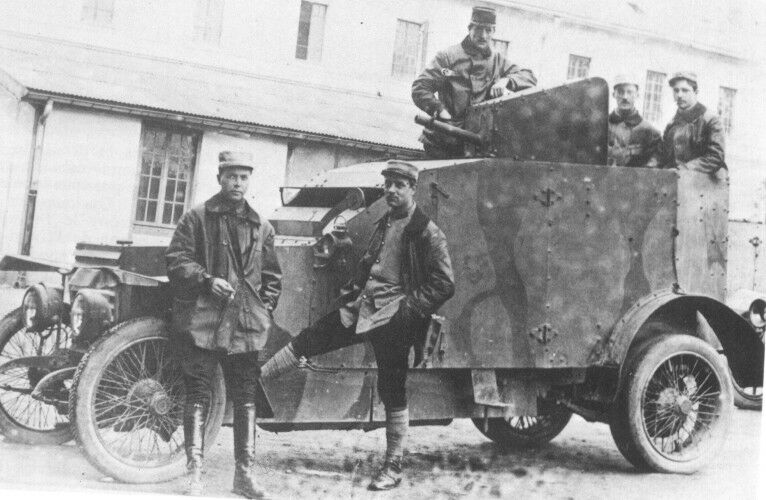
- Type: Armoured car
- Place of origin: France

Service history
- In service: 1914–41
- Used by: France; Poland; Kingdom of Romania; Kingdom of Serbia; Kingdom of Yugoslavia
- Wars: First World War; Polish–Soviet War; Second World War

Production history
- Designed: 1914
- Manufacturer: Peugeot
- Produced: 1914–15
- No. built: 270

Specifications
- Mass: 5 t (4.9 long tons; 5.5 short tons)
- Length: 4.8 m (15 ft 9 in)
- Width: 1.8 m (5 ft 11 in)
- Height: 2.8 m (9 ft 2 in)
- Crew: 3 or 4
- Main armament: AM - 1 x 8mm Hotchkiss M1914 MG; AC - 1 x 37mm Puteaux SA 18 Cannon
- Engine: Peugeot 4-cylinder petrol 40 hp (30 kW) at 2,500 rpm
- Drive: Wheeled 4x2
- Operational range: 140 km (87 mi)
- Maximum speed: 40 km/h (25 mph)
- References: Bishop and Forty & Livesey.

The Peugeot armoured car was a four-wheeled armoured vehicle based on a commercial Peugeot truck that was quickly developed by the French in 1914 for use during the First World War.

== Design ==
The Peugeot armoured car was built in two main versions, the Peugeot AM ("automitrailleuse") was armed with an 8 mm (0.31 in) Hotchkiss Model 1914 machine gun, and the Peugeot AC ("autocannon") armed with a 37 mm (1.5 in) Puteaux SA 18 breech-loading cannon. The two armaments were interchangeable and were mounted on a pivot mount fitted with a curved gun shield.

The main production models of the Peugeot armoured car were built on the Peugeot 18 CV ("cheval-vapeur" or horsepower) type 146 or type 148 chassis. The Peugeot armoured car had a front mounted engine, driver in the middle and an open-topped fighting compartment at the rear. To support the additional weight of the armour and armament, the chassis and suspension were strengthened and double wheels were used on the rear. The driver's position was protected by well sloped armour, the engine was armoured with steel shutters protecting the radiator.

== History ==
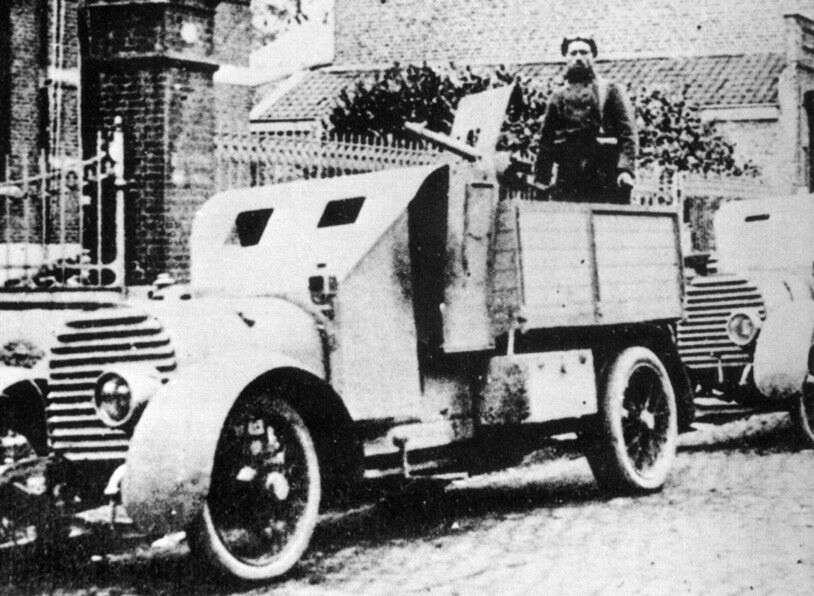
Early Peugeot armoured car with wooden sides

In the early months of the war, commercially acquired Peugeot type 153 tourers were hastily converted to open topped armoured cars by the addition of slab-sided 5.5 mm (0.22 in) thick armoured plates around the crew compartment and an unprotected rear fighting compartment with wooden sides with a central pivot mounted machine gun or 37mm gun protected by a light gun shield, 120 were built.

Later in the year a purpose designed version was developed, designed Captain Reynault it was based on the larger type 146 chassis. The new design provided armoured protection for the engine and fighting compartment and a more enclosed gun shield for the armament, although the top remained open. 150 were built, later in the production run the type 146 chassis was supplemented by the type 148 chassis.

== Service ==
From 1915 the Western Front had bogged down in trench warfare and there was little use in French service for these cars, some being used for rear area patrols. By 1918 only 28 Peugeots remained in service.

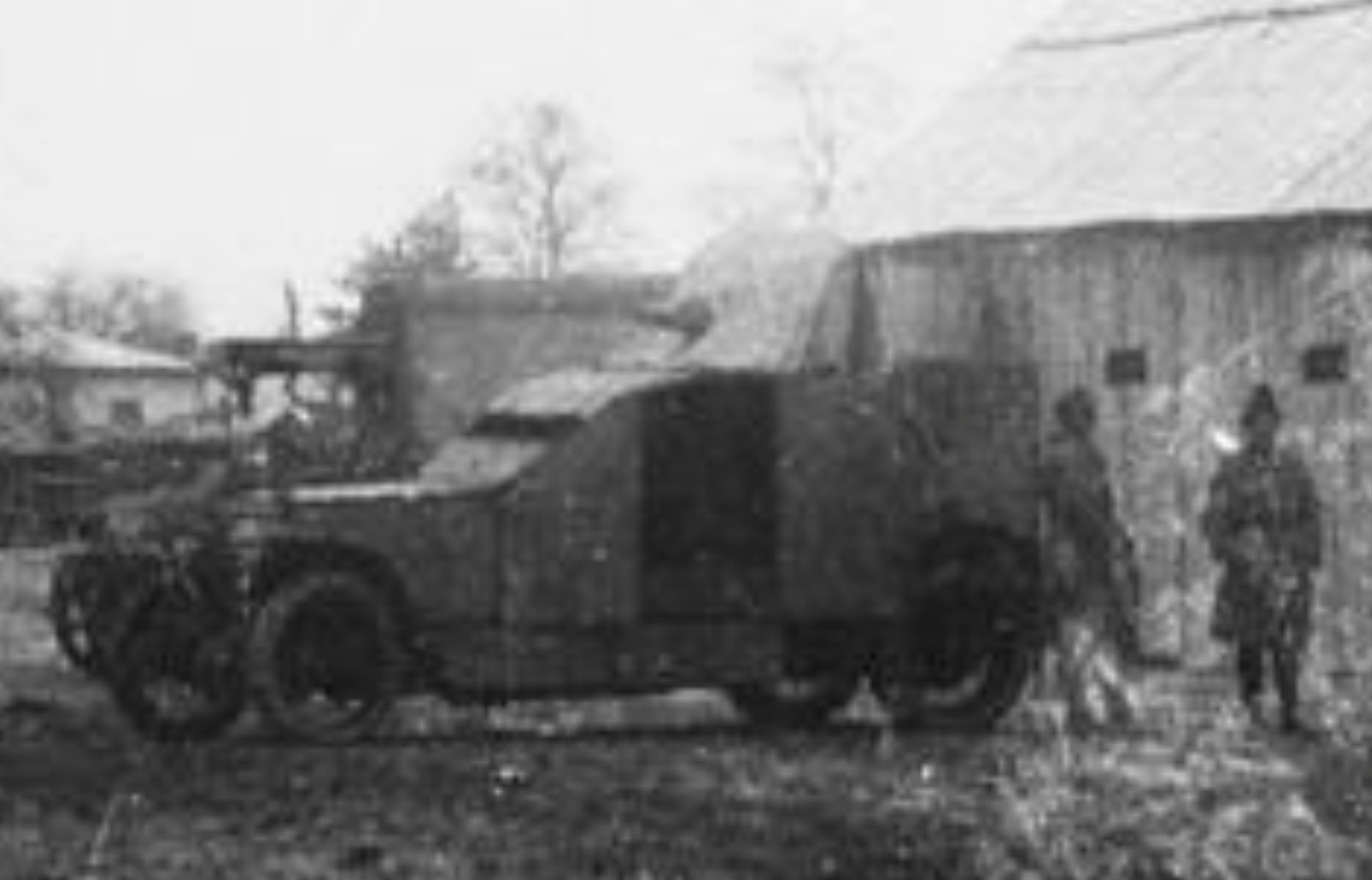
Romanian Peugeot armoured car in 1917

Two Peugeot armoured cars armed with machine guns were purchased by Romania and assigned to Grupul de automitraliere (lit. 'Auto machine gun group') in 1916. The group was reorganized as Grupul de autoblindate (Armoured car group) in November 1916 after the reception of another two armoured cars. The unit, consisting of Peugeot and Renault armoured cars, participated with the cavalry brigade in the offensive of the Romanian Second Army on the Soveja road, and in the defence of Grozești in 1917. Some Peugeot armoured cars were still in service with reconnaissance units of the cavalry regiments at the start of World War II, but were likely withdrawn shortly afterwards.

In August 1920, 18 Peugeots were sold to Poland for use against the Soviets in the Polish–Soviet War. They arrived in September and did not take part in hostilities, which were coming to a conclusion by then. Several cars saw action during May Coup fighting in 1926. By the early 1930s the type was considered obsolete and were replaced in Polish Army service, although the type continued in service with the police by September 1939. A couple supported Polish defenders around Chorzów in Upper Silesia against German saboteurs during the invasion of Poland on 1 September 1939.

In 1918 four Peugeots were also provided to the Kingdom of Serbia, they remained use with the Kingdom of Yugoslavia until 1941, seeing combat against the invading Germans.

== Gallery ==
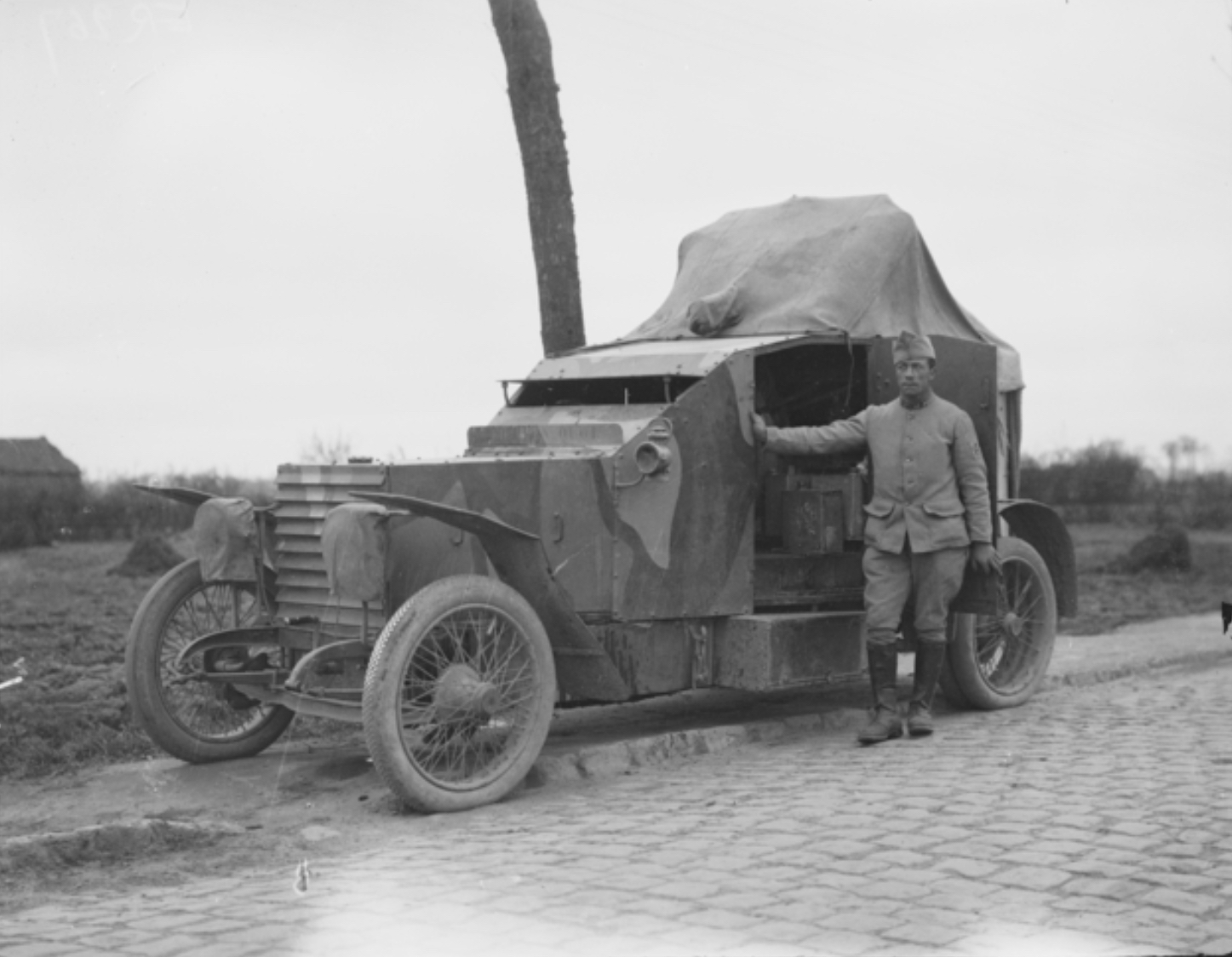

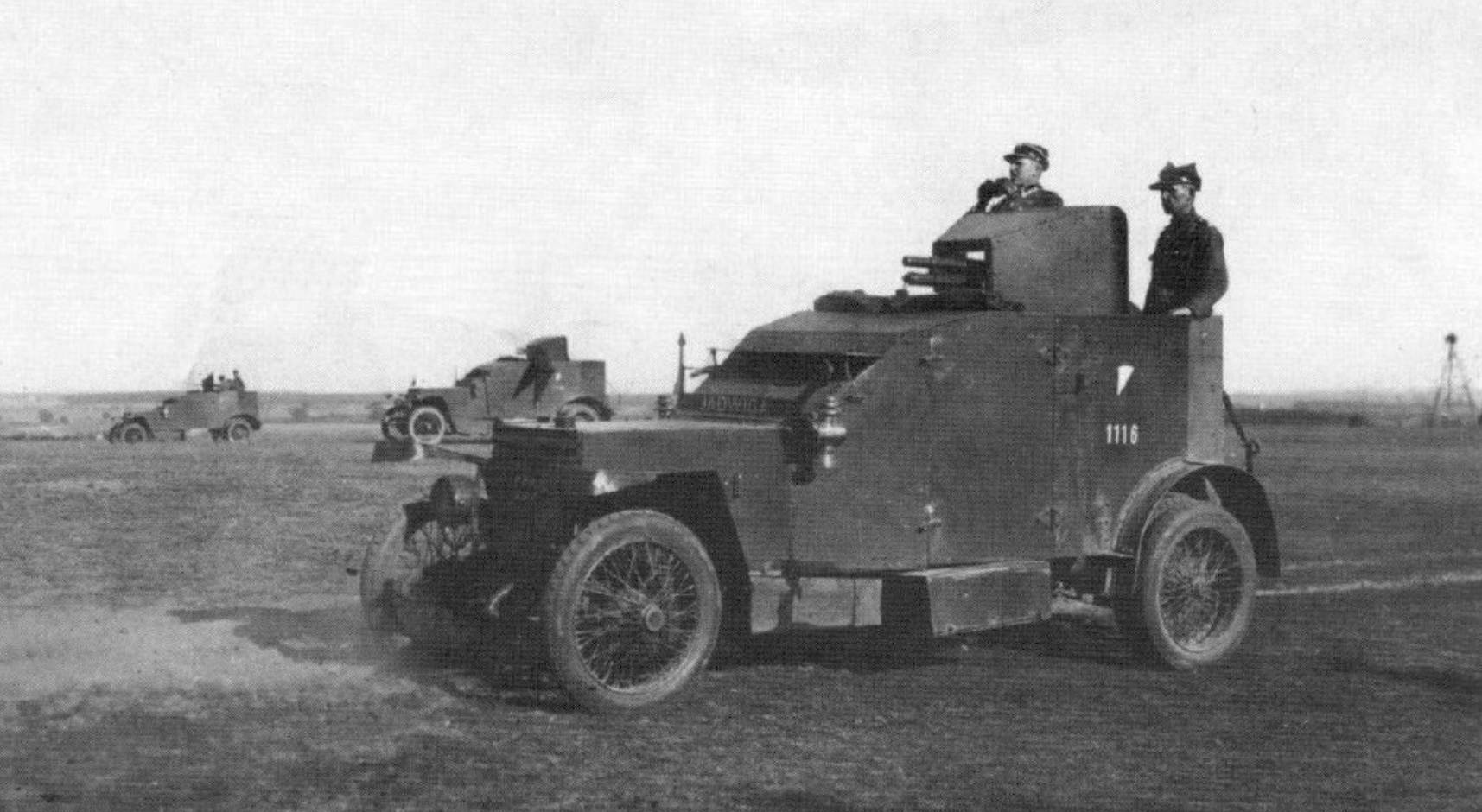

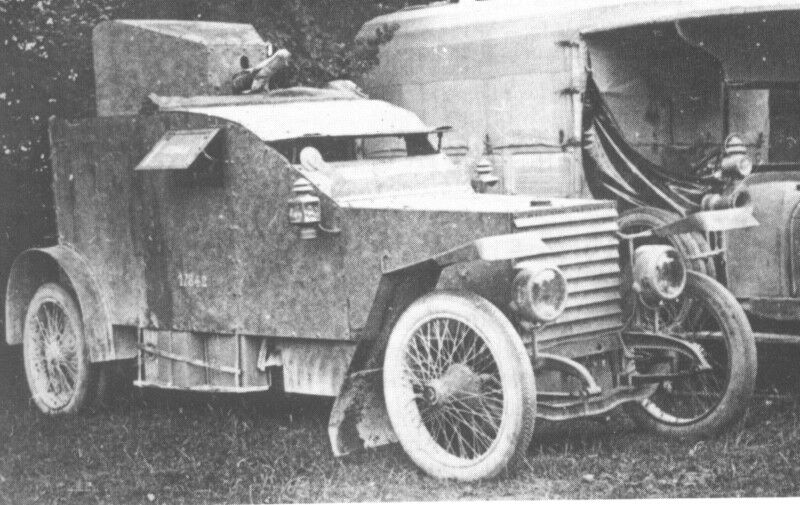

== See also ==
- List of combat vehicles of World War I
