= White AM armoured car =

French First World War armoured car

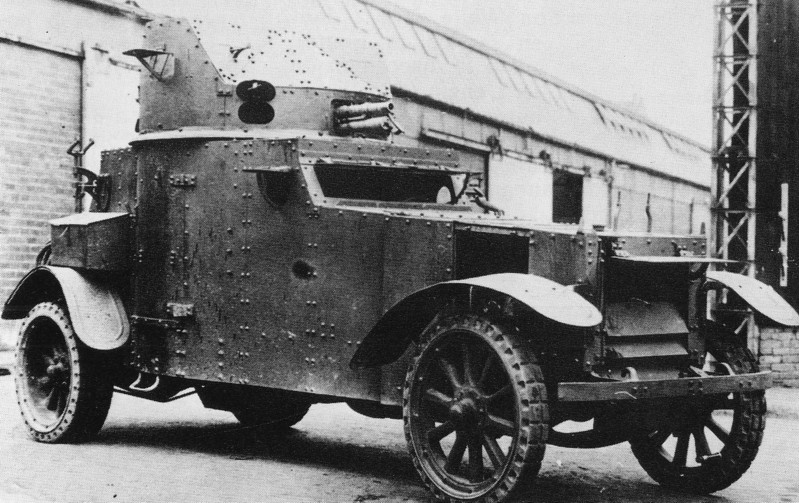
- Type: Armoured car
- Place of origin: France & United States

Service history
- In service: 1915-1943
- Used by: France; Germany (captured)
- Wars: First World War; Second World War

Production history
- Manufacturer: Ségur & Lorfeuvre & White Motor Company
- No. built: ≈ 250
- Variants: White AM Mle 1915; White AM Mle 1917/18; White-Laffly AMD 50; White-Laffly AMD 80

Specifications
- Mass: 6 t (5.9 long tons)
- Length: 5.6 m (18 ft 4 in)
- Width: 2.1 m (6 ft 11 in)
- Height: 2.75 m (9 ft 0 in)
- Crew: 4
- Armour: 5–8 mm (0.20–0.31 in)
- Main armament: 1 x 37mm Puteaux SA 18 gun
- Secondary armament: 1 x 8mm Hotchkiss M1914
- Engine: White 4-cyl petrol 26 kW (35 bhp)
- Drive: 4x2 rear wheel drive
- Suspension: Leaf springs
- Ground clearance: 40 cm (1 ft 4 in)
- Operational range: 240 km (150 mi)
- Maximum speed: 45 km/h (28 mph)

The White AM armoured car (officially the Automitrailleuse White or abbreviated as the White AM) was a French First World War armoured car that was built on a commercial American White Motor Company truck chassis with armoured bodies supplied by the French firm Ségur & Lorfeuvre, it was used by the French military from its introduction in 1915. Between the wars the French military completely rebuilt the vehicles as the White-Laffly AMD 50 and the Laffly-Vincennes AMD 80, in these guises it served until at least 1943.

== History ==
In 1915 France imported bare White Motor Company trucks chassis from the United States for which the French firm Ségur & Lorfeuvre designed, manufactured and fitted armoured hulls locally, the designers were able to draw upon lesson learnt from the earlier Renault and Peugeot armoured cars, the White combining the two weapons from the two variants of the Peugeot into the one turret. An initial batch of 20 vehicles were built, known as the White AM Mle 1915. In 1915 the Western Front had bogged down in trench warfare and there was little use in French service for armoured cars, so production was suspended. In 1917 production was recommenced using locally manufactured White truck chassis, known as the White AM Mle 1917/1918, unlike the Mle 1915 they had right hand drive, approximately 230 were built. 205 White AMs were still in service by the war's end in 1918.

In the late 1920s the original White chassis were deemed to be completely worn out, but the armoured bodywork was seen to be in good condition so in 1927 and 1928 designs were drawn up to replace the chassis. The first prototype White-Laffly AMD 50 (AMD standing for Auto-Mitrailleuse de Découverte) was delivered in 1931 and 98 examples were upgraded, despite retaining none of the original White chassis the name White was retained to indicate the vehicle's origins. It was soon determined that a further upgrade was required and so in 1933 the first Laffly-Vincennes AMD 80 was delivered, in total 28 examples were produced before the French Army switched procurement to the completely new Panhard 178.

== Design ==
=== White AM ===
The White AM consisted of a turreted armoured car built upon imported American White truck chassis, with the armoured bodywork built and fitted in France, later vehicles were built upon locally manufactured White truck chassis. The layout was similar to other armoured cars of the period with a front mounted engine, driver and co-driver in the centre behind the engine with the turret immediately behind the drivers, a set of duplicated rear facing driver's controls were at the rear of the hull to allow the vehicle to safely be driven backwards at speed. Fully loaded the vehicle weighted around 6 tonnes (5.9 long tons), comparatively heavy compared to other similar armoured cars of the period.

The White AM's armoured hull had a maximum armour thickness of 8 millimetres (0.31 in), it comprised approximately 30 armoured panels bolted onto a rigid steel frame and provided full over head protection for the crew. The fully enclosed turret housed a 37mm Puteaux SA 18 gun and an 8mm Hotchkiss M1914 machine gun, unusually the two weapons were at opposite sides of turret, in service this arrangement proved difficult for the gunner compared to a coaxial arrangement. The chassis was 4x2 rear wheel driven with leaf springs and doubled wheels at the rear, its 4-cylinder petrol engine delivered 26 kilowatts (35 bhp) for a maximum speed of 45 kilometres per hour (28 mph), it had a maximum range of 240 kilometres (150 mi).

White-Laffly AMD 50
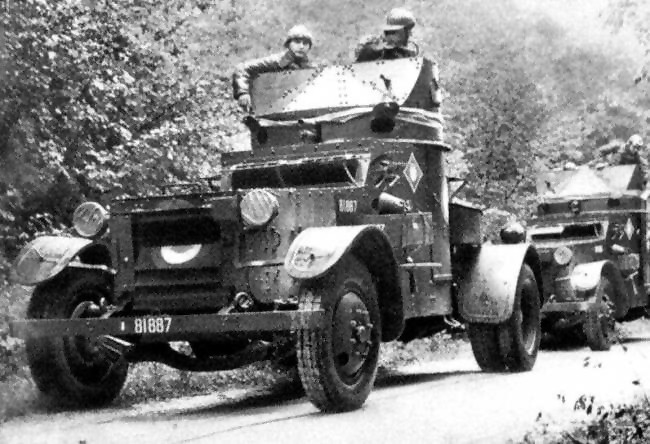

Specifications
- Mass: 6.5 t (6.4 long tons)
- Main armament: 1 x 37mm Puteaux SA 18 gun
- Secondary armament: 1 x 7.5 mm FM 24/29
- Engine: Laffly 4-cyl petrol 37 kW (50 bhp)
- Operational range: 300 km (190 mi)
- Maximum speed: 60 km/h (37 mph)

=== White-Laffly AMD 50 ===
The White-Laffly AMD 50 upgrade saw the White chassis completely discarded, with armoured hull fitted to a Laffly chassis. The new chassis had a more powerful Laffly 4-cylinder engine delivering 37 kilowatts (50 bhp) which gave an increased maximum speed of 60 kilometres per hour (37 mph) and increased range of 300 km (190 mi), the vehicle retained the original turret with the 37 mm main armament, whilst the machine gun was substituted for a 7.5 mm FM 24/29 still in the rear facing position.

Laffly-Vincennes AMD 80
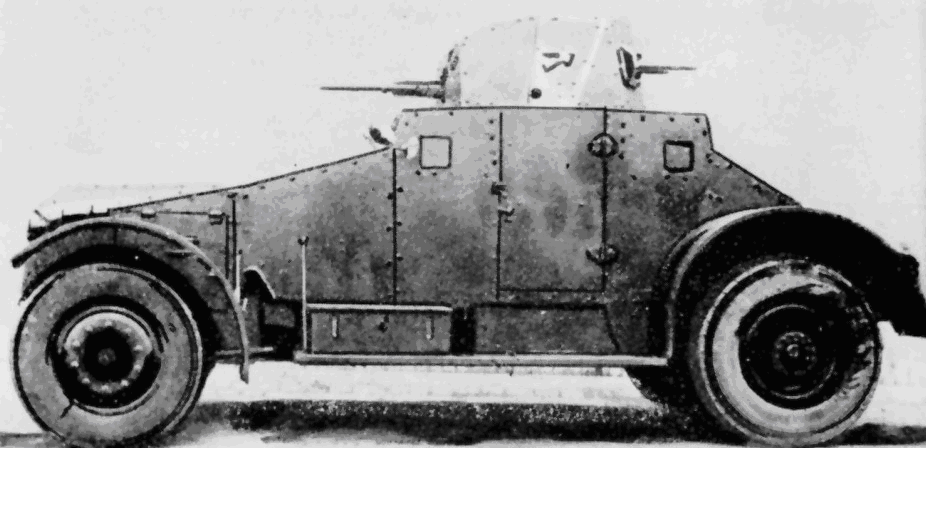

Specifications
- Mass: 7.5 t (7.4 long tons)
- Main armament: 13.2 mm Hotchkiss M1929 machine gun
- Secondary armament: 2 x 7.5 mm FM 24/29
- Engine: White 4-cyl petrol 60 kW (80 bhp)
- Operational range: 400 km (250 mi)
- Maximum speed: 80 km/h (50 mph)

=== Laffly-Vincennes AMD 80 ===
The Laffly-Vincennes AMD 80 was a new design by Atelier de Fabrication de Vincennes, basing upon Laffly LC2 chassis, with a whole new body, superficially similar to previous designs. This chassis featured a more powerful again Laffly 4-cylinder engine delivering 60 kilowatts (80 bhp) which gave an further increased maximum speed of 80 kilometres per hour (50 mph) and range of 400 km (250 mi). The White-Laffly AMD 80 also had a new turret which mounted a 13.2 mm Hotchkiss M1929 heavy machine gun, a coaxial 7.5 mm FM 24/29 machine gun and a second FM 24/29 mounted at the rear of the turret.

== Service ==
By 1918 the French Army considered the White AM to be their best and most useful armoured car design and they were used extensively on the Western Front.

From 1937 both the White-Laffly AMD 50 and Laffly-Vincennes AMD 80 had been replaced in continental French service by the Panhard 178 and they were predominantly relegated to France's overseas territories, by May 1940 AMD 50s could be found in Algeria, Tunisia, Indochina and Lebanon although 13 remained in Metropolitan France, whilst all remaining AMD 80s were in French North Africa. The Metropolitan French examples were captured by the invading German forces and were briefly used by the Wehrmacht to train personnel. The vehicles in North Africa continued in service until at least 1943 when the remaining vehicles were replaced by American M8 Greyhounds. The 5th Algerian Spahis Regiment received a peloton of AM 80s in 1944 but they were replaced before 1946 by Panhard 165/175 armoured cars.

== Gallery ==
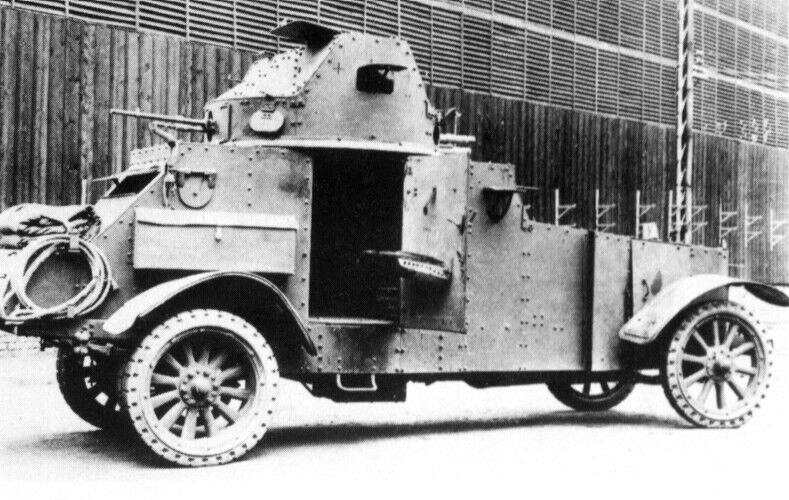
White AM

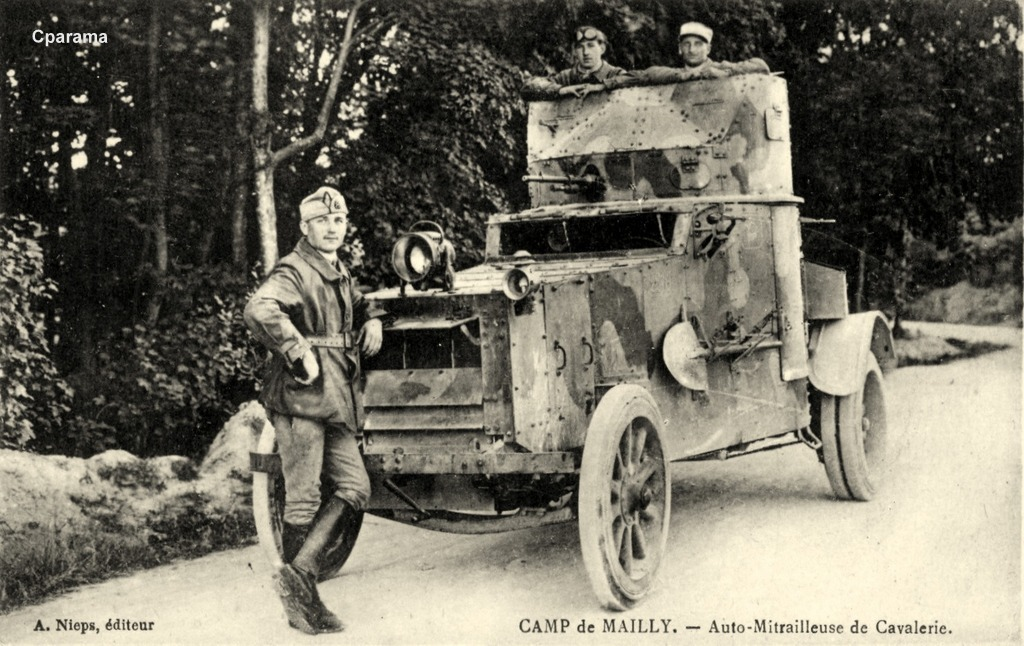
White AM

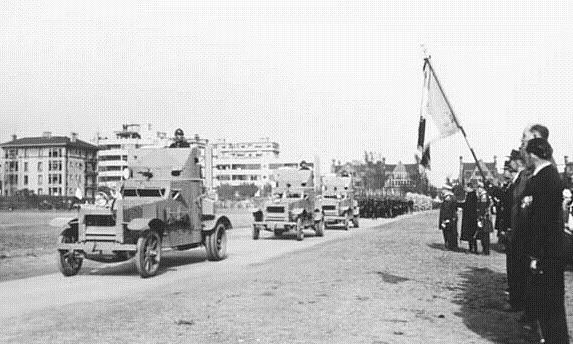
White AM

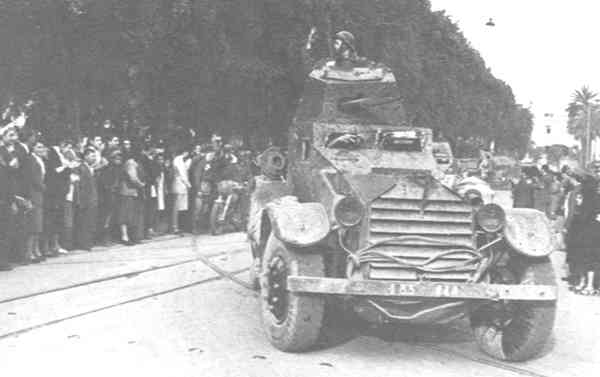
White-Laffly AMD 80

== See also ==
- List of combat vehicles of World War I
- List of armoured fighting vehicles of World War II
