= Seabrook armoured lorry =

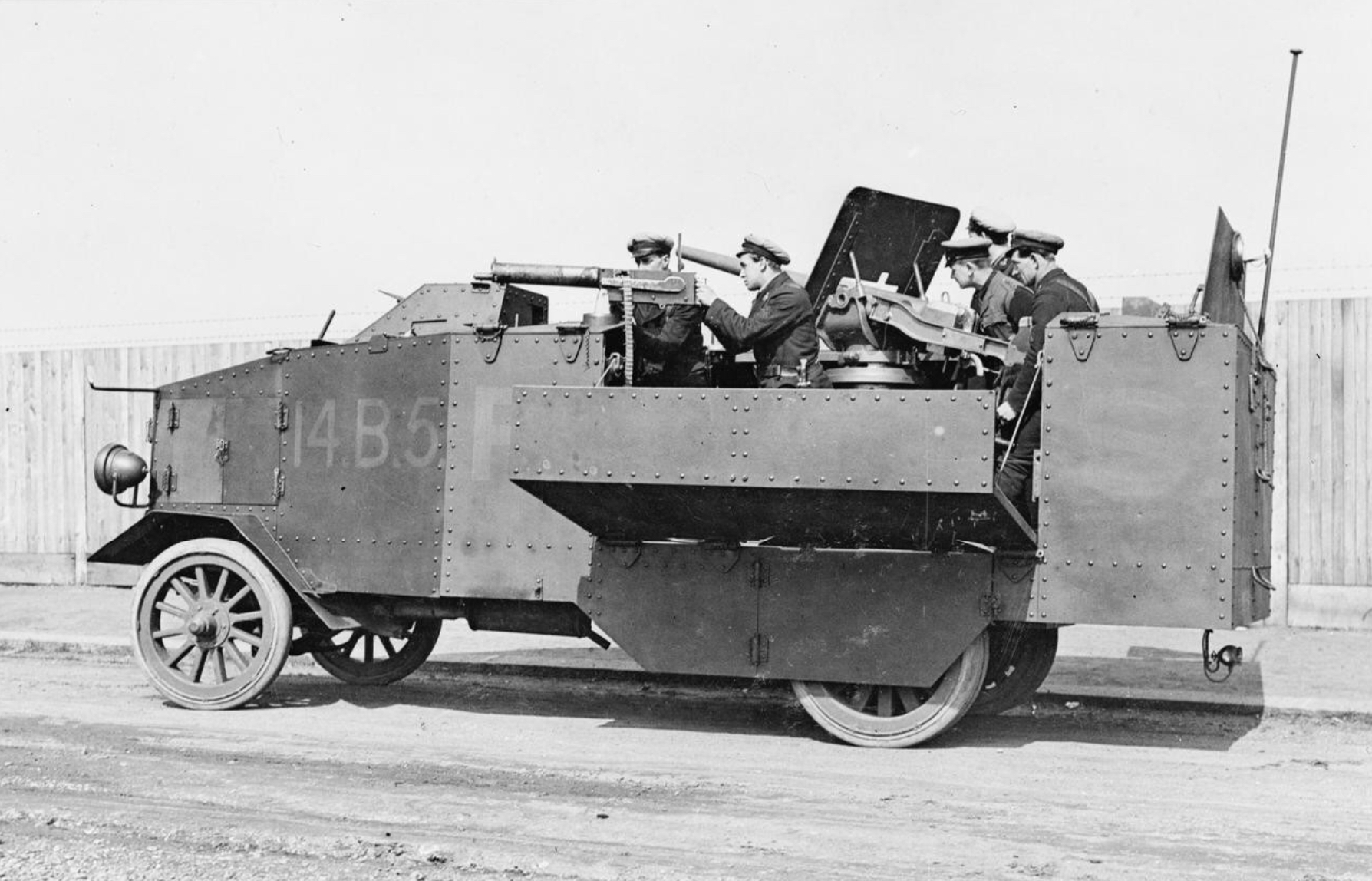
- Type: Armoured car
- Place of origin: United Kingdom & United States

Service history
- In service: 1915–1918
- Used by: Royal Naval Air Service & British Army
- Wars: First World War

Production history
- Designer: Charles Samson
- Designed: 1914
- Manufacturer: Portholme Aerodrome Limited
- Produced: 1915
- No. built: 30

Specifications
- Mass: 10 long tons (10 t)
- Length: 24 ft (7.3 m)
- Width: 7 ft (2.1 m)
- Height: 6 ft (1.8 m)
- Crew: 6–9
- Armour: .31 in (7.9 mm)
- Main armament: QF 3-pounder (47 mm) Vickers
- Secondary armament: 2 or 4 x .303 in (7.7 mm) Maxim or Vickers machine guns
- Engine: 4-cylinder Continental; 32 hp (24 kW)
- Drive: Wheeled 4x2
- Operational range: 100 mi (160 km)
- Maximum speed: 20 mph (32 km/h)
- References: Foss & White.

The Seabrook armoured lorry was a British heavy armoured car built on the chassis of an American 5-ton truck which saw service with the Royal Naval Air Service during the First World War.

== Design ==
The Seabrook was a commercially acquired lorry with armoured bodywork and armament added to convert it to a fighting vehicle. The armoured bodywork was fitted to a Seabrook 4x2 5-ton lorry chassis; Seabrook did not manufacture the chassis or engine but imported them from the Standard Motor Truck Company in Detroit, USA.

The Seabrook provided armoured protection for the commander and driver: behind them was an open topped, high sided fighting compartment with drop down sides to enable the use of the main armament and provide room for four to seven additional crewman. It was armed with a QF 3-pounder (47 mm) Vickers semi-automatic gun on a pedestal mount giving 360 degree traverse and was also fitted with two or four .303 in (7.7 mm) Maxim or Vickers machine guns. The rear of the vehicle was a large stowage box for ammunition and equipment.

== History ==
Following his successes with machine gun armed armoured cars, Charles Samson and some of his subordinate officers designed an armoured lorry to mount a Vickers QF 3-pounder gun. The gun and armoured body were fitted by Forges et Chantiers de France at Dunkirk. The vehicle was completed on 16 October 1914 and it was in action the next day in support of the 2nd Life Guards, 3rd Cavalry Division.

The vehicle was found to be useful and it was decided to equip every armoured car section in the Royal Naval Armoured Car Division with a 3-pounder armed heavy armoured car. The Seabrook lorry was chosen to mount the armoured body, which was built and fitted by Portholme Aerodrome Limited at Huntingdon. The first was delivered on 5 February 1915.

== Service ==
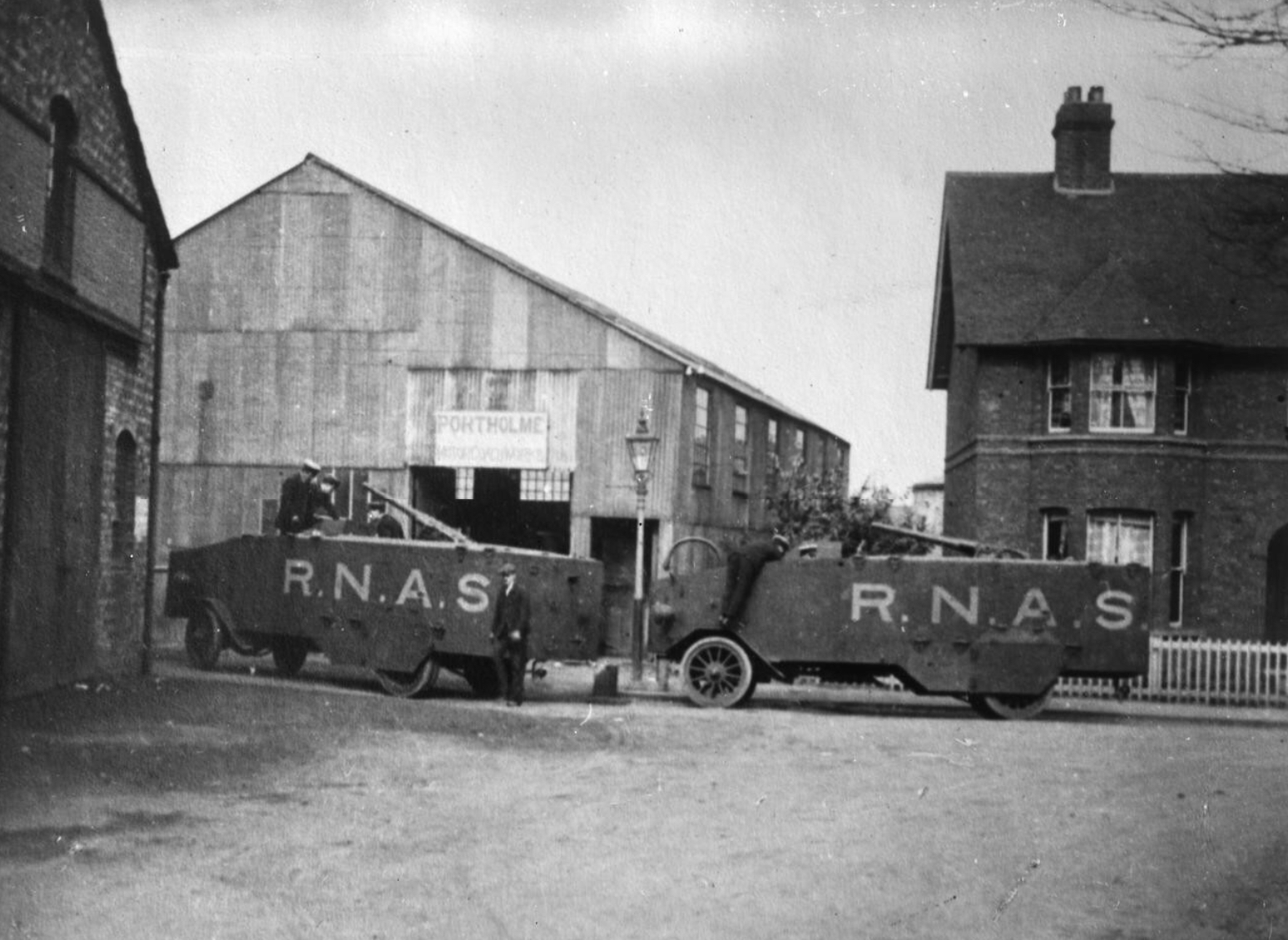
Two Seabrook armoured lorries

Initially three Seabrooks were issued to each Royal Naval Armoured Car Division squadron. They were intended to provide heavy fire support to the machine gun armed Lanchester and Rolls-Royce armoured cars. Although the first armoured lorry had given little trouble, and proved the concept of a gun-armed fire support vehicle, the large crew and heavy armament overloaded the Seabrook chassis and in service the springs, the wheels with their solid rubber tyres, and the back axle often failed. Moreover, the vehicle's cross country performance was poor, preventing it from keeping up with armoured cars it was supporting.

Due to this, it was decided the Seabrooks should be grouped into separate squadrons and five six-vehicle squadrons were formed. Most of these served in France, but in November 1915 one was sent to Egypt to support the Senussi Campaign. Due to their poor off-road performance they were found to be totally unsuitable for desert operations. When the Royal Naval Armoured Car Division was disbanded, most of the Seabrooks were transferred to the British Army. Because of its mechanical difficulties and poor off-road performance, the decision was later made to restrict the Seabrooks to formed roads.

== See also ==
- List of combat vehicles of World War I
