= White armored car =

American armored vehicle

White AEF
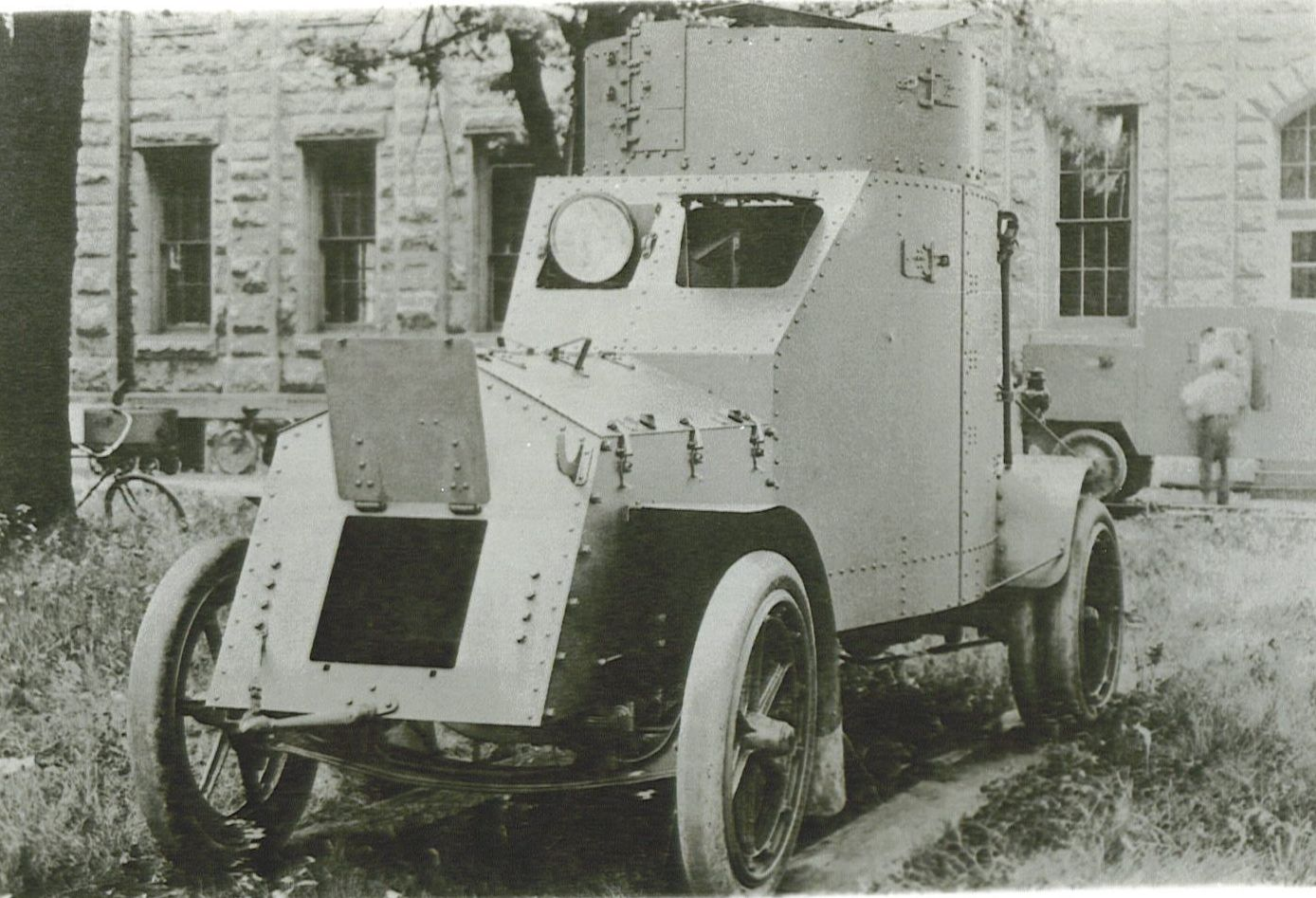
- White 4x2 armored car (1916)
- Type: Armored Vehicle
- Place of origin: United States

Service history
- Used by: French Army, United States Army and United States Marines
- Wars: World War I

Production history
- Manufacturer: White Motor Company
- Produced: 1918

Specifications
- Mass: 3.37 tons
- Crew: 3
- Armor: 3.8–6.35 mm
- Main armament: M1895 Colt–Browning machine guns
- Engine: 4-cylinder petrol 45 hp
- Suspension: 4x2 wheel leaf spring
- Maximum speed: max 65 mph

The White armored car was a series of armored cars developed by the White Motor Company in Cleveland, Ohio from 1915.

== Models ==
- White Number 1 built in 1915 and used by the French.
- White AM 4x2 armored car built in 1915 from US chassis fitted with armoured hull by Laffly. Used by the French Army during WW-1.
- White No.2 4x2 armored car built in 1916 and used by the United States Army and United States Marines.
- White Model 1917 4x2 armored car built in 1917. Not put into production. Developed into the White AEF.
- White AEF (also known as White Model 1918) 4x2 armored car built in 1918 and used by the American Expeditionary Force, French Army until 1933 and in the French colonies until 1941. Some were modernized and fitted with French Laffly chassis, known as White-Laffly.

The White Motor Company continued after the First World War to develop armored cars including the M1 Scout Car, M3 Scout Car, M2 Half Track Car, M3 Half-track, M13 Multiple Gun Motor Carriage, and M16 Multiple Gun Motor Carriage.

== See also ==
- G-numbers
