= Autocanon de 47 Renault =

WW1 French armoured car

Autocanon de 47 Renault mle 1915
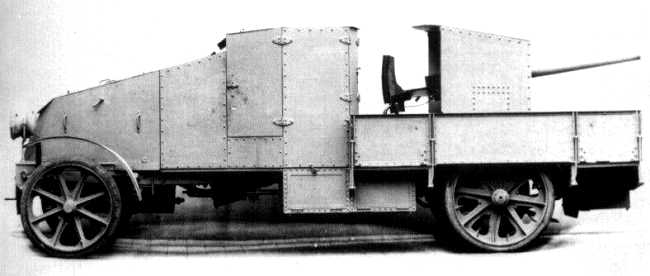
- side view of the vehicle
- Type: Armored Car

Service history
- In service: 1915–1919
- Used by: France
- Wars: World War I

Production history
- Designed: 1914
- No. built: 100 ordered 4 actually built

Specifications
- Mass: 3 tonnes (3.3 short tons; 3.0 long tons) (estimated)
- Length: 4.7 m (15 ft 5 in)
- Width: 1.7 m (5 ft 7 in)
- Height: 1.7 m (5 ft 7 in)
- Crew: 4 (driver, commander, gunner, loader)
- Armor: metal plating between 4 - 6 mm
- Main armament: 47 mm QF 3-pounder Hotchkiss
- Engine: 4-cycle Renault gasoline engine 15 hp (11 kW)
- Power/weight: 5 hp/tonne
- Transmission: Manual 4 x 2 steering transmission
- Suspension: Leaf spring suspension
- Operational range: Approximately 100 km (62 mi)
- Maximum speed: 20 km/h (12 mph)

The Autocanon de 47 Renault was an armoured car designed by Renault in 1915.

== History ==
In 1914, the French army realised the need for increased fire support and mechanisation, which started the requirement for "Auto-canons", armoured cars armed with rapid-fire guns. The author of this particular vehicle was Lieutenant Villeneuve-Bargnemont, who worked with Renault to produce a prototype based on a commercial 2.7 tonne truck chassis. The prototype vehicle was delivered August 15, 1915, but by that time the stabilisation of the front left little need for a vehicle of its type and only 4 vehicles would be completed. In use, the 15 hp engine was overloaded and the armoured grill didn't have enough airflow, leading to frequent overheating. The armoured cab overloaded the front suspensions. The vehicles would see limited use in the north and were dismantled shortly after the war.

== Description ==
the vehicle is based on the Renault Type EP commercial truck, the truck had a wheelbase of 3 metres. the track width was 1620mm at the front axle, and 1670mm at the rear axle, it was rear wheel drive with steering front wheels, the driver sat on the right. the engine had the classical disposition at the time of being placed in front of the radiator, the truck bed was low enough that the wheel arches protruded.

The cab was armoured in the style of the Auto-mitrailleuse Renault Modèle 1914, the armour had a wedge shape and was narrower over the engine compartment. The armoured ammunition rack was situated right behind the cab. The bed was not armoured, the bed sides dropped to form a platform for the gunner to stand on when firing over the sides.

The 47mm Mle 1902 gun was installed on a pedestal mount between the wheel arches and was provided a shield. the gun placement allowed it a firing arc of 270° to the rear, an elevation of 25° and a depression of 10°.
