= Gun Carrier Mark I =

British self-propelled artillery

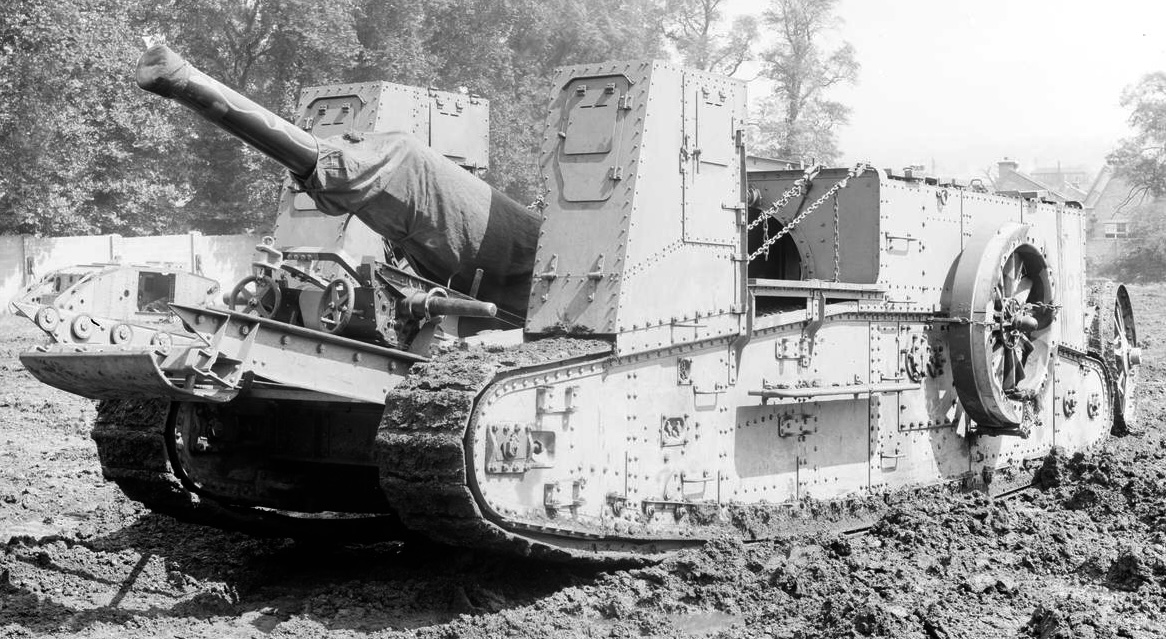
- British Gun Carrier Mark I carrying a 60-pounder gun
- Type: Self-propelled artillery
- Place of origin: United Kingdom

Service history
- Used by: UK
- Wars: First World War

Production history
- Designed: July 1916
- Manufacturer: Kitson & Co.
- Produced: July 1917 – March 1918
- No. built: 48
- Variants: Gun Carrier Crane, Gun Carrier Mark II (projected)

Specifications
- Mass: 27 long tons (27 t) unloaded 34 long tons (35 t) maximum
- Length: 30 ft (9.1 m); 43 ft (13 m) with gun and tail
- Width: 11 ft (3 m)
- Height: 9 ft 4 in (3 m)
- Crew: 4 + 8-man gun crew
- Main armament: 60-pounder gun or 6-inch howitzer
- Secondary armament: 1 machine-gun
- Engine: Daimler petrol engine 105 hp (78 kW)
- Power/weight: 3.9 hp per ton
- Payload capacity: 7 long tons (7.1 t)
- Transmission: primary gearbox: 2 forward, 1 reverse secondary: 2 speeds
- Suspension: Unsprung
- Operational range: 23.5 mi (37.8 km)
- Maximum speed: 3.7 mph (6.0 km/h)

The Gun Carrier Mark I was a British vehicle of the First World War. The gun carrier was designed to transport a 6-inch howitzer or a 60-pounder gun forward soon after an attack to support infantry in advanced positions. Gun carriers were first used in the Battle of Pilckem Ridge (31 July – 2 August 1917) during the Third Battle of Ypres (31 July – 10 November 1917). The carriers moved guns and equipment but were used for the rest of the war mainly for carrying equipment and supplies through areas under fire, where porters in the open would have suffered many casualties. The 6-inch howitzer could be fired while mounted, making the Gun Carrier Mark I the first modern self-propelled gun, a weapon capable of independent action and having tactical mobility on the battlefield.

== Background ==
In early 1916, the tactical conditions on the Western Front could leave infantry who had captured positions exhausted, disorganised, short of supplies, out of touch with the rear and incapable of defeating a counter-attack. Allied artillery was being moved by tractor and an armoured, tracked vehicle would allow artillery to be moved in areas under German fire. Major John Greg, an engineer working for Metropolitan, Carriage, Wagon and Finance, proposed to build special mechanised artillery, using parts of the Tank Mark I. Greg began work on a design with Major Walter Wilson, an inventor who had worked on the Tank Mark I, on 7 March. At first, carriage of the BL 6-inch howitzer, 8-inch howitzer or the 60-pounder gun (5-inch) was envisaged but the idea of transporting the 8-inch howitzer was dropped. On 3 March 1917, the prototype was tested at Oldbury with other experimental vehicles at a Tank Trials Day.

== Design ==
The prototype Gun Carrier Mark I (War Department serial number GC 100) was 30 ft (9.1 m) long, and included a Tank Mark I steering tail; with the tail and carrying a gun, the equipment was 43 ft (13 m) long. The vehicle was 11 ft (3.4 m) wide and 9 ft 4 in (2.84 m) high. The gun carrier moved on tracks 20.5 in (520 mm) wide and about 5 ft (1.5 m) high. The empty weight was 27 long tons (27 t) and the vehicle was propelled by a 105 hp (78 kW) Daimler engine (3.9 hp per ton). The vehicle had a Tank Mark I transmission of a primary gearbox with two forward and one reverse gear; there were two-speed secondary gears for each track. The gun carrier was operated by a commander, driver and two gearsmen. An armoured box enclosed the rear half of the vehicle, overhanging the tracks which ran through a gap. The front half of the machine had a platform for a gun with two armoured cabs, one for the driver and one for the commander, above the tracks at the front on each side.

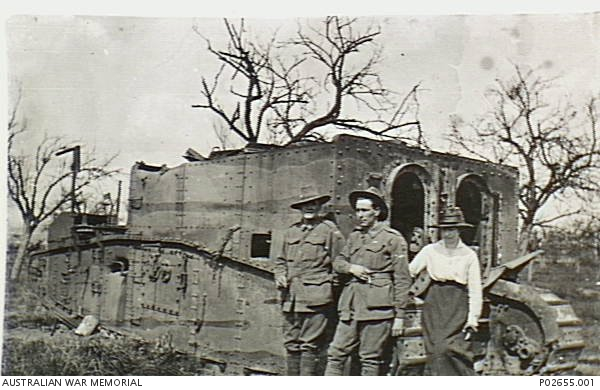
Rear view of a disabled gun carrier, Villers-Bretonneux, 1919

The vehicle had an endurance of about eleven hours, with a top speed of 3.7 mph (6.0 km/h) on flat ground and could cross trenches up to 11 ft 6 in (3.51 m) wide. There was no room for track spuds to be attached, and in tests it was found that mud and debris clogged the track runs, pierced the superstructure and holed the radiators above them. A 6-inch howitzer or a 60-pounder gun could be winched backwards onto the gun platform at the front and secured, the wheels being removed and hung over the sides of the gun carrier. Sixty rounds of ammunition were carried for either gun bringing the weight to 31 long tons (31 t) for the 6-inch howitzer and 34 long tons (35 t) for the 60-pounder. The armoured box at the back accommodated an eight-man gun crew and each vehicle carried a machine-gun.

== Production ==
=== Gun Carrier Mark I ===
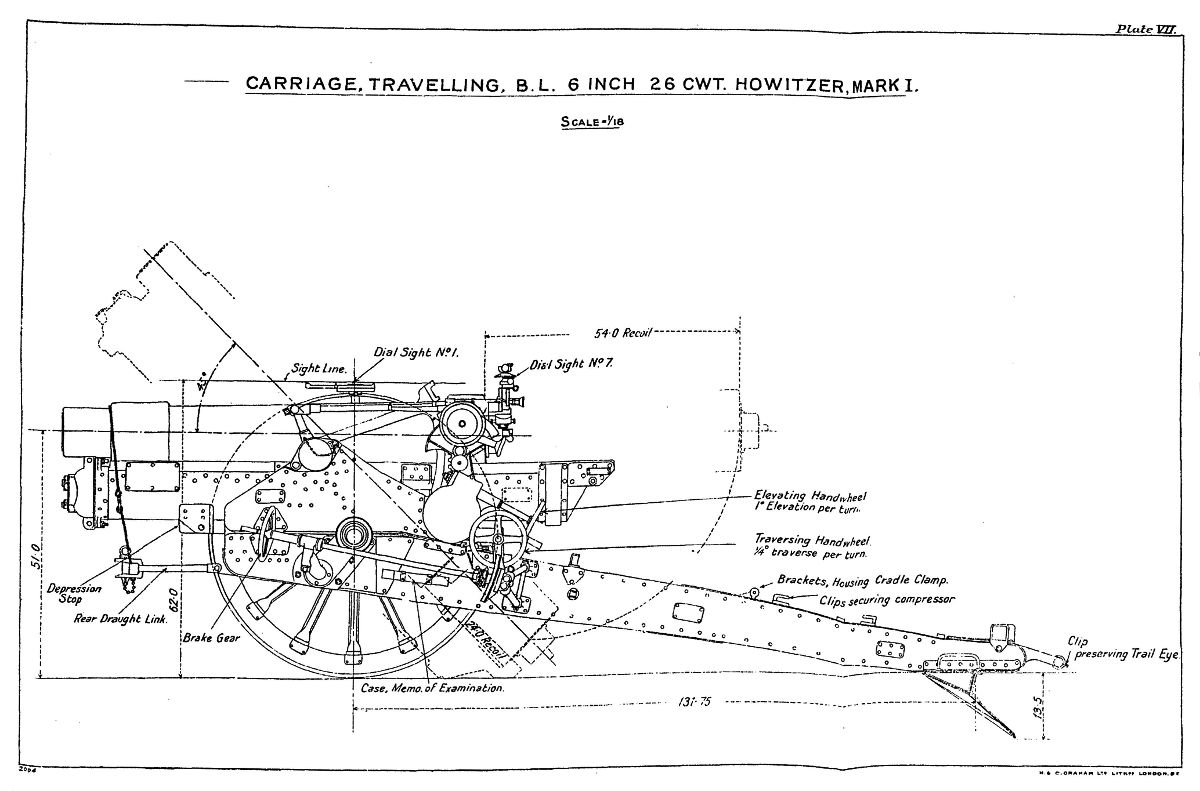
BL 6-inch 26 cwt MK I howitzer carriage left elevation diagram

Work by Greg and Wilson began on 7 March 1916 but only with GHQ approval, which was received on 17 May 1916. The Ordnance Board refused to approve the design on 15 June 1916 and Albert Stern, the Secretary of the Landship Committee appealed to David Lloyd George, the Minister of Munitions. Lloyd George over-ruled the Board and unilaterally placed an order for fifty vehicles the next day. On 29 May 1917 the War Office ordered

...a motor gun carriage which could keep closer to infantry than a horse-drawn field gun... The object of such a weapon would be the destruction of buildings and emplacements.

The prototype was built by the Metropolitan Carriage, Wagon & Finance Co. and was finished on 1 January 1917. An order was placed with Kitson & Co. in Leeds for 49 gun carriers (changed to 47 gun carriers and two salvage vehicles on 16 October 1917). Trials of the prototype began around 2 February 1917 and at Shoeburyness ranges the 60-pounder was fired from the carrier. Six gun carriers and the two salvage vehicles were delivered to the army in the second quarter of 1917, 14 in the third quarter, 29 in the fourth quarter and the last five in the first quarter of 1918 at a price of £168,000 for the carriers and £10,000 for the two salvage vehicles.

=== Salvage vehicles ===
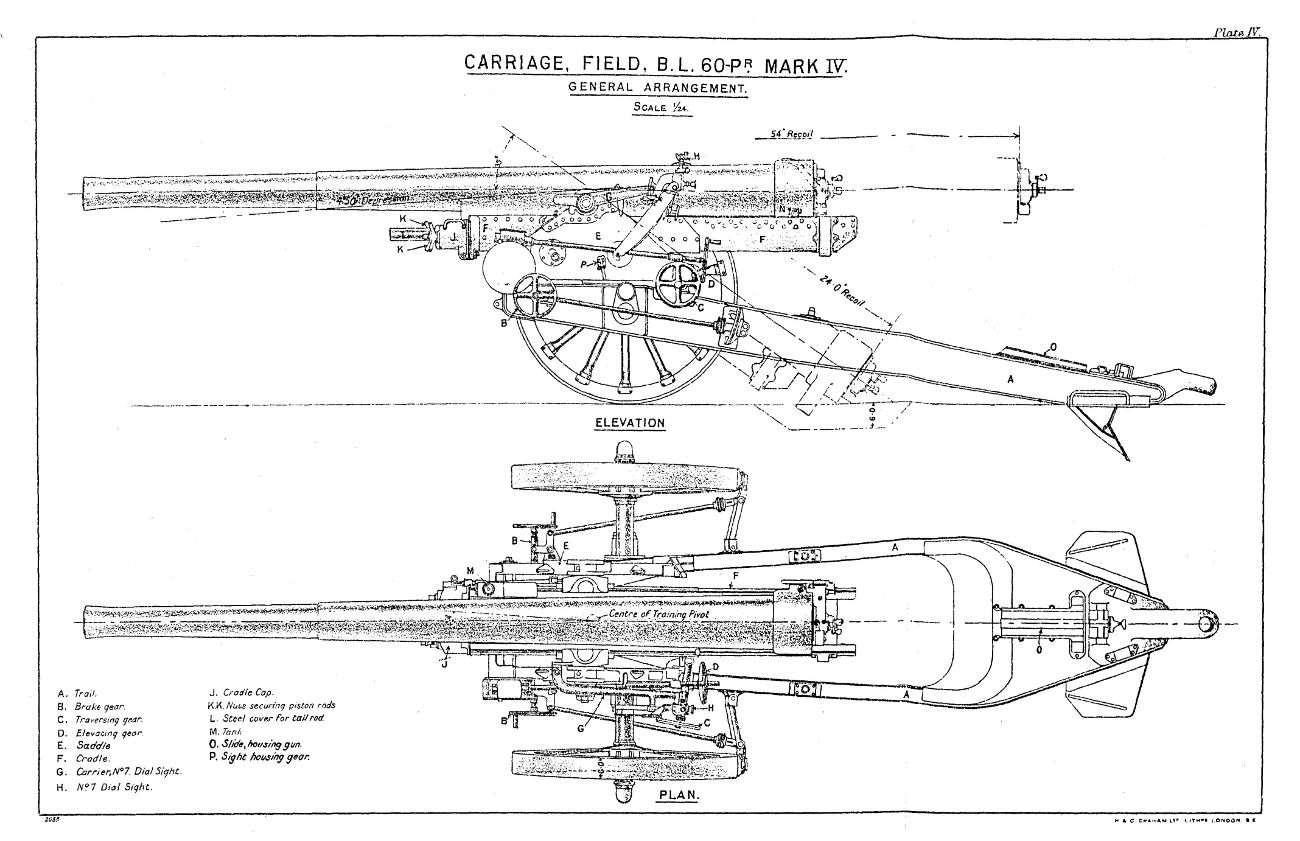
BL 60-pounder gun Mark II on carriage Mark IV left elevation and plan diagrams

The two forward driving cabs were removed, the carrying platform was covered and a hand-crane to lift 3-long-ton (3.0 t) loads on a jib or 10 long tons (10 t) using shear legs. The box had a cab in front, behind which was a winding drum connected to the engine for hauling with a wire hawser; the price of the two vehicles was £10,000. In December a third vehicle was equipped with a Priestman Brothers clamshell steam-grab. David Fletcher suggests this was the track chassis of the prototype Gun Carrier.

=== Gun Carrier Mark II ===
A revised Gun Carrier Mark II was designed but only a mock-up was built. The hull covered two-thirds of the length of the vehicle and the carrying platform was moved to the back. The front end was built on similar lines to Tank Marks IV and V, with the tracks raised at the front for climbing obstacles. The vehicle was to be powered by a 150 hp (110 kW) Ricardo engine through epicyclic gears. Guns would be embarked at the rear and retain their wheels but not fire from the vehicle.

== Operational service ==
=== 1917 ===
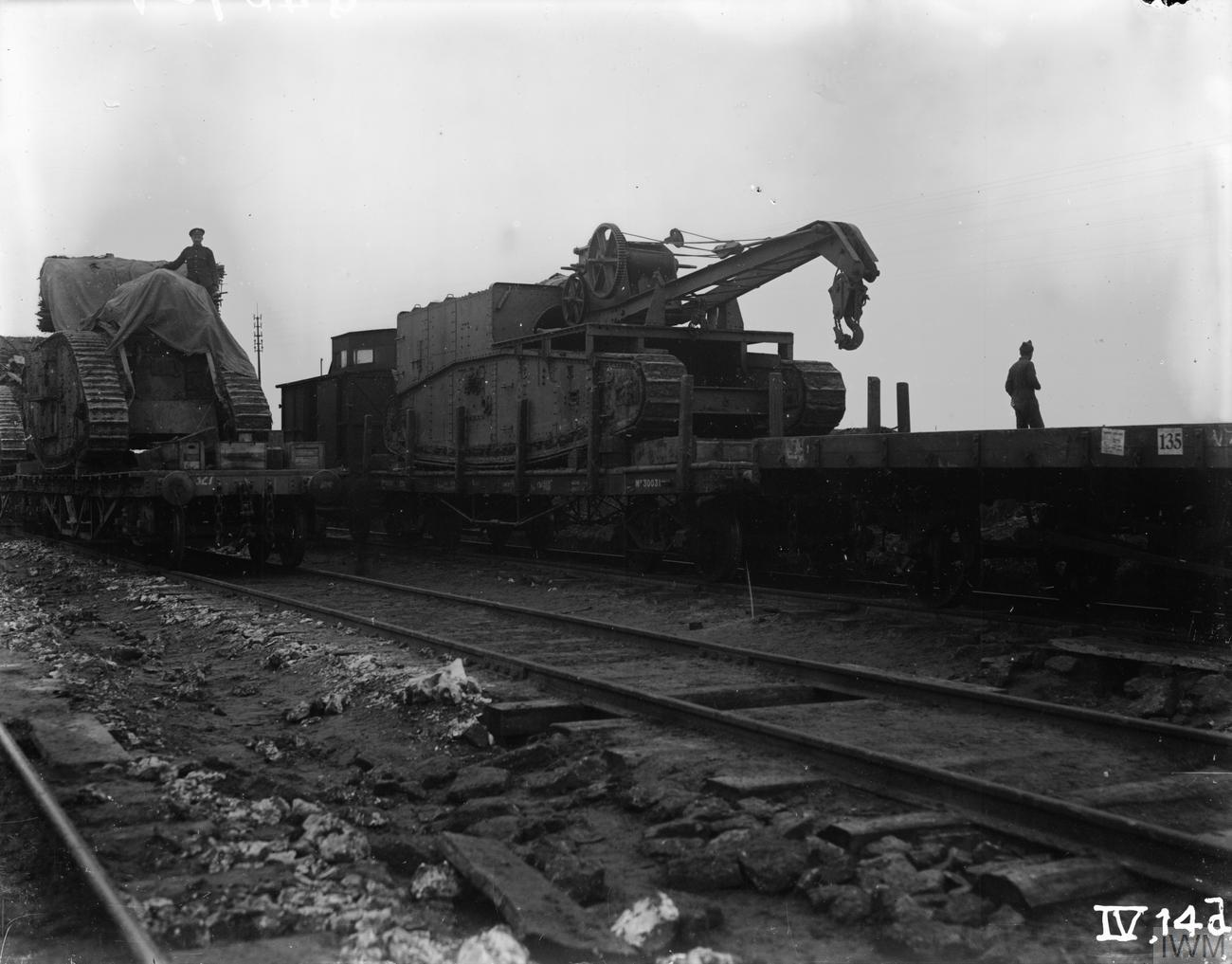
Salvage tank on a train

Gun Carrier GC 100 arrived in France before the Third Battle of Ypres (31 July – 10 November 1917) and was attached to XVIII Corps for field trials. The gun carrier was first used at the Battle of Pilckem Ridge (31 July – 2 August 1917) and the steering tail was soon dispensed with. During the fighting in Flanders, the carrier brought several hundred tons of ammunition and several 60-pounder guns forward. On at least one occasion, a 6-inch howitzer was fired from GC 100 which then changed position to confuse the Germans. The 1st Gun Carrier Company was formed on 6 September and greatly eased the task of moving supplies, each carrier moving loads of 7 long tons (7.1 t) which would have needed a carrying party of 290 men. By the end of the year 44 gun carriers were in France. As supply tanks, the gun carriers had much greater capacity than converted Mark I and Mark IV tanks and were in constant demand. Seven gun carriers were available for the opening of the Battle of Cambrai on 20 November 1917.

=== 1918 ===
In June 1918, the two gun carrier companies were converted to supply companies and attached to the 3rd and 5th Tank Brigades. At the Battle of Hamel (4 July 1918), Captain James Smith led the four machines of the 1st Gun Carrier Company forward with 20–25 long tons (20–25 t) of engineer stores to within 400 yd (370 m) of the final objective, within thirty minutes of its capture. As the vehicles returned the crews picked up seventy wounded soldiers and transported them to a dressing station. Four officers and sixteen men transported the equivalent of 1,200 man-loads, the equivalent of about two infantry battalions' worth of stores and equipment. One gun carrier moved 133 rolls of barbed wire, 450 screw pickets, 45 corrugated-iron sheets, fifty tins of water, 150 mortar bombs, 10,000 rounds of ammunition and twenty boxes of hand grenades. When the 1st and 2nd Supply companies reached France, they joined the 1st and 4th Tank Brigades and the 3rd, 4th and 5th Supply companies were posted to Blingel Camp, near Bermicourt which had driving and maintenance facilities. In late July the 3rd and 5th Supply companies were re-equipped with Mark IV supply tanks and Mark IVs with fitments to haul sledges full of supplies. By August the 1st Gun Carrier Company was attached to the 5th Tank Brigade and the 2nd Company to the 3rd Tank Brigade.

The 22 gun carriers of the 1st Gun Carrier Company were allotted to the Australian Corps during the Battle of Amiens (8–12 August 1918). On the night of 6/7 August, the 1st Gun Carrier Company drove to an orchard on the west of Villers-Bretonneux carrying explosives. A shell from a German battery near Chipilly ignited a camouflage net on one of the carriers, thick smoke rose and German artillery bombarded the orchard. The vehicle crews and some Australian gunners rescued three carriers which were driven out of danger but the rest exploded; Major W. Partington, commander of the 1st Gun Carrier Company was wounded. When not needed for tank support, the gun carriers shifted engineer stores and ammunition for the infantry, being of great use in areas swept by machine-gun fire. The 2nd Gun Carrier Company carried forward a 6-inch howitzer to conduct harassing fire at night, moving around to deceive the Germans. Several gas attacks were carried out by gun carriers moving Livens projectors and gas bombs over ground too cut up for wheeled vehicles. The cross-country mobility of the gun carriers enabled more bombs to be fired in the dark and the carriers to vacate the area before dawn. For the remainder of the war, gun carriers were in great demand to carry tank supplies over ground unfit for wheeled vehicles. On 18 September, during the Hundred Days Offensive, Australian infantry were so understrength during operations against the Hindenburg outpost-line, that two gun carriers moved supplies to the first objective. Eleven days later, the 5th Tank Supply Company, with 17 carriers, supported the Australian Corps at the Hindenburg Line.

== Analysis ==
Once the gun had been winched aboard and fixed to a cross beam, it was near its usual firing position. In a 2013 publication, John Glanfield described the vehicle as a "dual self-propelled gun/gun carrier". The vehicle had been designed for the 6-inch howitzer, which could be fired from the vehicle and the 60-pounder Mk II, none of which were in France in 1917 and the Mk I had to be disembarked to fire. As supply vehicles, the gun carriers excelled, being able to carry a heavy load on the platform, rather than inconveniently placed inside a converted tank.

== Bibliography ==
Books

- Bean, C. E. W. (1942). The Australian Imperial Force in France during the Allied Offensive, 1918. Official History of Australia in the War of 1914–1918. Vol. VI (1st [online] Australian War Memorial, Canberra ed.). Sydney: Angus and Robertson. OCLC 865594842.
- Fletcher, D. (2001). The British Tanks 1915–19. Marlborough: Crowood Press. ISBN 978-1-86126-400-8.
- Foley, M. (2014). Rise of the Tank: Armoured Vehicles and their use in the First World War (e-book ed.). Barnsley: Pen & Sword Military. ISBN 978-1-4738-4134-5.
- Fuller, J. F. C. (1920). Tanks in the Great War, 1914–1918. New York: E. P. Dutton. OCLC 559096645 – via Archive Foundation.
- Glanfield, J. (2013) [2001]. The Devil's Chariots: The Birth and Secret Battles of the First Tanks (e-pub, Osprey ed.). Stroud: Sutton. ISBN 978-1-4728-0268-2.
- Harris, J. P. (1995). Men, Ideas and Tanks: British Military Thought and Armoured Forces, 1903–39. Manchester: Manchester University Press. ISBN 978-0-7190-4814-2.
- Livesey, Jack (2007). Armoured Fighting Vehicles of World Wars I and II. London: Anness. ISBN 978-1-84476-370-2.
- Stern, Albert G. (1919). Tanks 1914–1918: The Log Book of a Pioneer. London: Hodder & Stoughton. OCLC 385642 – via Archive Foundation.

Theses

- Hammond, Christopher Brynley (2005). The Theory and Practice of Tank Co-operation with other Arms on the Western Front during the First World War. findit.bham.ac.uk (PhD thesis). University of Birmingham. OCLC 911156915. EThOS uk.bl.ethos.433696.
