= FCM 1A =

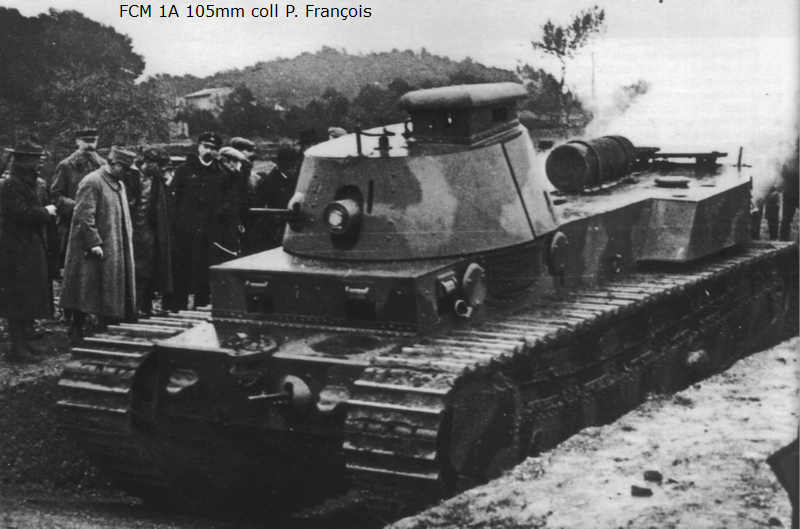
- FCM 1A
- Type: Heavy tank
- Place of origin: France

Specifications
- Mass: 41.2 t (45.4 short tons)
- Length: 8.27 m (27 ft 2 in)
- Width: 2.842 m (9 ft 3.9 in)
- Height: 3 m (9 ft 10 in)
- Crew: 7, later reduced to 6
- Armor: 35 mm (1.4 in) front, 21 mm (0.83 in) sides and rear.
- Main armament: Canon de 105 mle 1913 Schneider, 122 rounds
- Secondary armament: 2 8mm Lebel Hotchkiss M1914 machine gun
- Engine: Renault, twelve cylinder 220 horsepower (160 kW)
- Ground clearance: 40 mm (1.6 in)
- Maximum speed: 2–10 km/h (1.2–6.2 mph)

The FCM 1A was French heavy tank that served as a prototype of the char 2C.

== Development ==
The FCM 1A began development in January 1917 when 200 hp engines became available. Trials were planned to start at the beginning of May after the first prototype began construction in April. However, after the failed Nivelle Offensive, the first operation where French tanks were used, all French tank development was halted. After a reversal of that decision, development was repeatedly delayed due to multiple problems.

Testing began on 20 November 1917 after six months of delays. The vehicle was the largest tank built up to that point, measuring 8.27 m (27.1 ft) long. The hull was extremely elongated in order to cross the trenches of the Western Front. The tank originally had a crew of 7, but the crew was reduced to 6 in December. The main armament was a shortened version of the Canon de 105 Court Schneider with a large ammunition capacity of 122 rounds.

It had a Renault 220 hp engine, allowing a maximum speed of 10 km/h (6.2 mph) and a minimum speed of 2 km/h (1.2 mph). The suspension consisted of bogies, sprung by leaf springs, of four wheels. The tank could cross a 3.5 m (11 ft) gap and overcome a 1 m (3.3 ft) gap.

Mobility tests showed issues with the tank’s tracks and with the engine overheating, but mobility was deemed unsatisfactory. Firing tests conducted between 5 and 7 February 1918 also had satisfactory results.
