= CLB 75 tank =

CLB 75 Tank
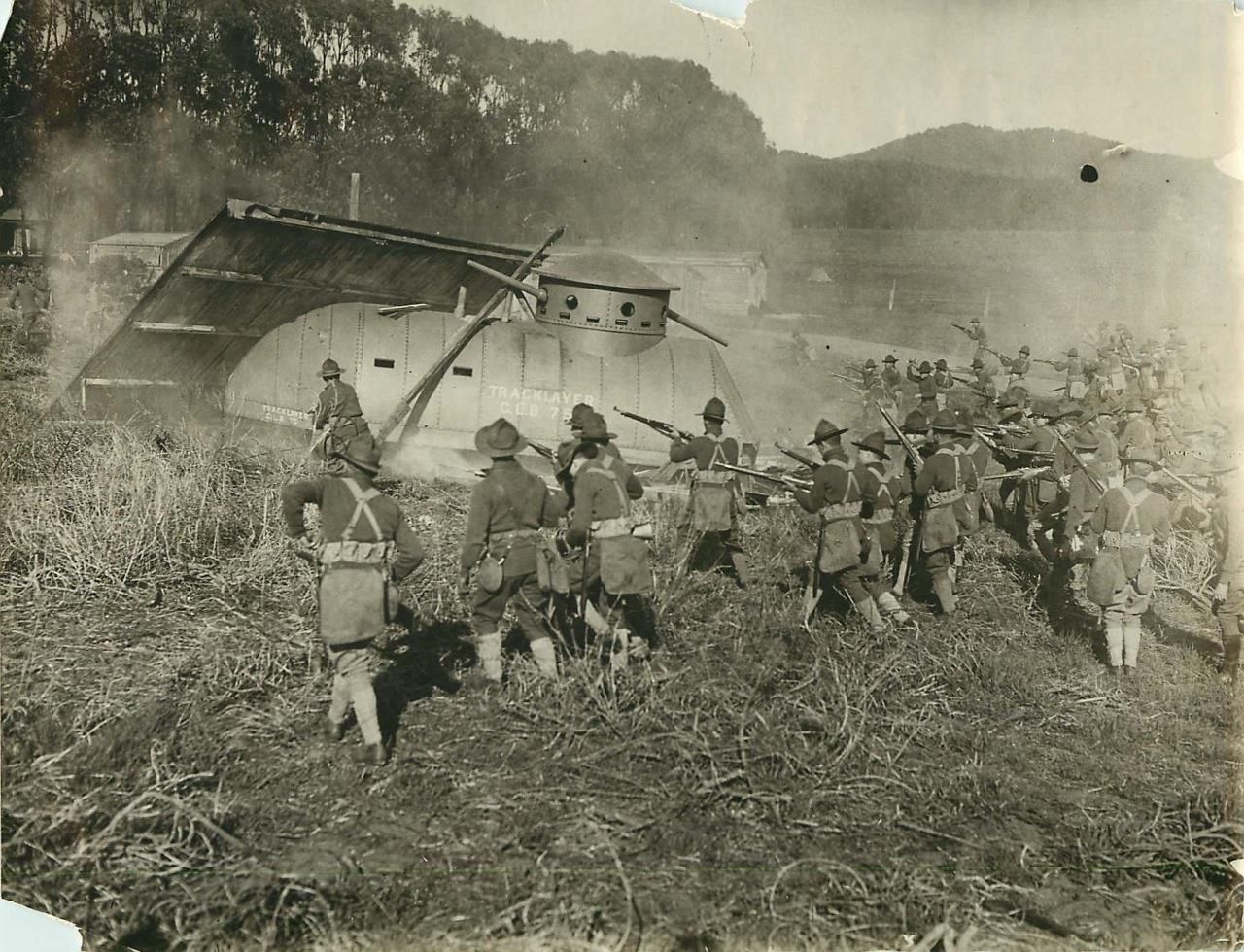
- California National Guard training with the CLB 75 Tank
- Place of origin: United States

Production history
- Manufacturer: C L Best Gas Traction Company

The CLB 75 Tank was a U.S.-produced, prototype armoured fighting vehicle built by C. L. Best's Traction Company of San Leandro, California. Best was a rival of the Holt Manufacturing Company in producing caterpillar tracked vehicles. Among Best's products was the CLB 75 hp (56 kW) 'Tracklayer' The tank was developed by putting an armoured hull over a CLB 75 sometime between late 1916 and early 1917.

The tank was widely photographed on July 4, 1917, parade in San Francisco. Only a few models were used one of which had a semi-cylindrical hull with a turret and another was similar but the hull had flat surfaces. The tanks trained with the California National Guard.

== See also ==
- Steam powered tracked tank
- Steam Wheel Tank

== Bibliography ==
Notes

References

- AK Interactive (2014). WWI The First Mechanized War. Ak-interactive, S.l. AK273.
- Zaloga, Steven J. (2017). Early US Armor: Tanks 1916–40. New Vanguard 245. illustrated by Felipe Rodríguez. Osprey Publishing. ISBN 9781472818096.
