= Puteaux SA 18 =

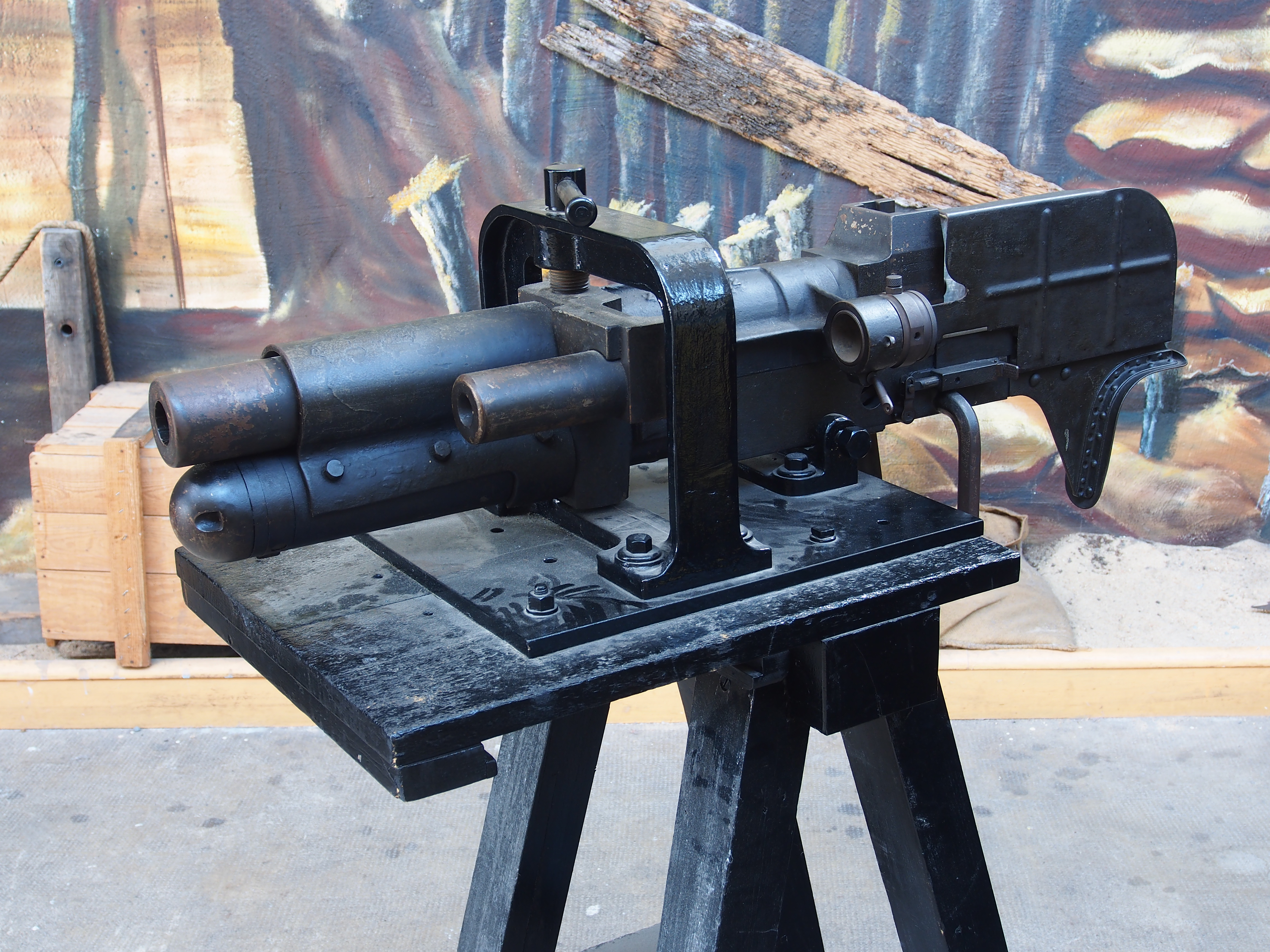
- Preserved SA 18 in the Saumur armour museum
- Type: Tank gun
- Place of origin: France

Service history
- In service: 1917–1980s
- Wars: World War I; Russian Civil War; Estonian War of Independence; Turkish War of Independence; Polish-Soviet War; Warlord Era; Rif War; São Paulo Revolt of 1924; Great Syrian Revolt; Revolution of 1930; Brazilian Constitutionalist War; Chinese Civil War; Spanish Civil War; Winter War; World War II; Franco-Thai War; 1947–1949 Palestine war; First Indochina War; Soviet–Afghan War

Production history
- Designer: Puteaux
- Designed: 1917
- Manufacturer: Puteaux

Specifications
- Mass: 88 kg (194 lb)
- Barrel length: 777 mm (30.59 in) L/21
- Cartridge: 37×94mmR
- Caliber: 37 mm (1.46 in)
- Rate of fire: Max: 15 rpm Practical: 10 rpm
- Muzzle velocity: AP: 410 m/s (1,300 ft/s); APCR: 600 m/s (2,000 ft/s); APDS: 600 m/s (2,000 ft/s); HE: 410 m/s (1,300 ft/s)

The Puteaux SA 18 was a French single-shot, breech-loading cannon, used in World War I through World War II, primarily mounted on combat vehicles. It is a development of the Canon de 37 mm à tir rapide Modèle 1916 (SA 16), also produced by Puteaux.

== Technical details ==
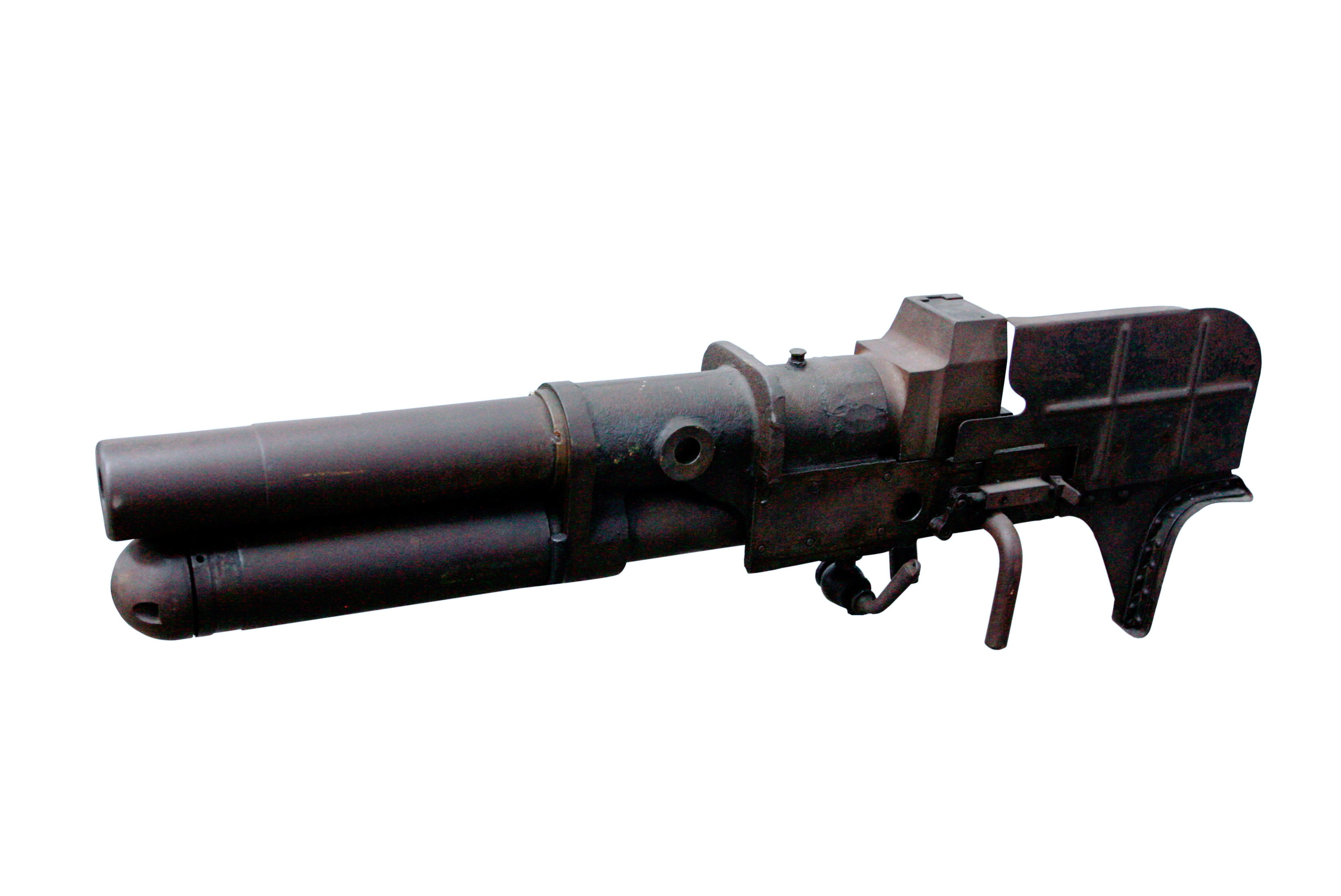
Canon de 37 mm SA18

It was a simple, reliable weapon with a high rate of fire made possible by a semi-automatic breech system. While its maximum fire rate was 15 rounds per minute, its practical rate was 10 rounds per minute. After firing, the breech opened and ejected the used cartridge case automatically.

The gun was operated by the gunner, who aimed it through a simple 1x direct scope separately attached to the left side of the weapon. It was found easy to use, with a low incidence of jamming.

The barrel length was 21 calibres (L/21). It was primarily intended to be used against infantry and machine-gun nests; its low muzzle velocity made it unsuitable for use against armour. Although its armour penetration capabilities were poor, it was able to combat light armoured vehicles as late as 1939.

== Usage ==
This gun was standard on French light tanks and armoured cars, being mounted on the Renault FT tank and White AM armoured car in World War I. In World War II, it was used on the Renault R-35, Hotchkiss H-35 and H-38, FCM-36 and several types of French armoured cars, mainly the White-Laffly AMD 50.

In the Polish Army of the 1920s through World War II the wz.18 Puteaux gun was used on Renault FT light tanks and Renault R-35 and Hotchkiss H-35, Peugeot armoured cars, and the Samochód pancerny wz. 28, Samochód pancerny wz. 29 and Samochód pancerny wz. 34 armoured cars. It was also used on some Polish riverine craft and armoured trains.
