= Renault armoured car =

Renault armoured cars were a number of armoured car variants produced in France during the First World War.

Like most of the armoured cars of the period they were developed from armoured bodies fitted to commercially available large car or truck chassis, in this case those from Renault, and armed with a machine gun or relatively small calibre gun.

== Variants ==
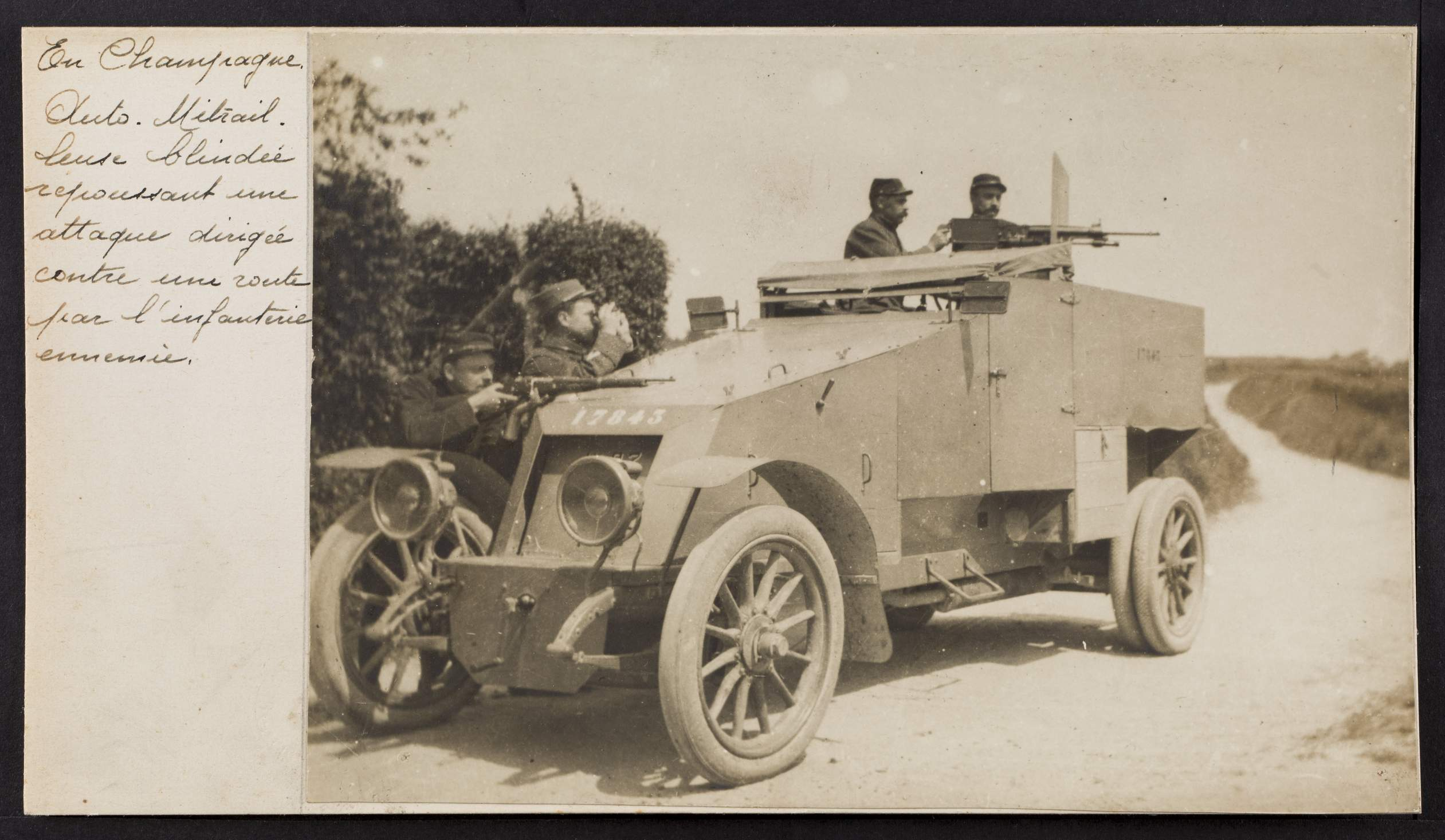
Renault 1914 armoured car (automitrailleuse).

- Renault modele 1914 automitrailleuse

Renault 18hp chassis with 95/160 engine. The first 100 were extemporised but a standard armoured body form followed with a machine gun at the rear. Together with twin rear tyres this formed the Modele 1915 variant.

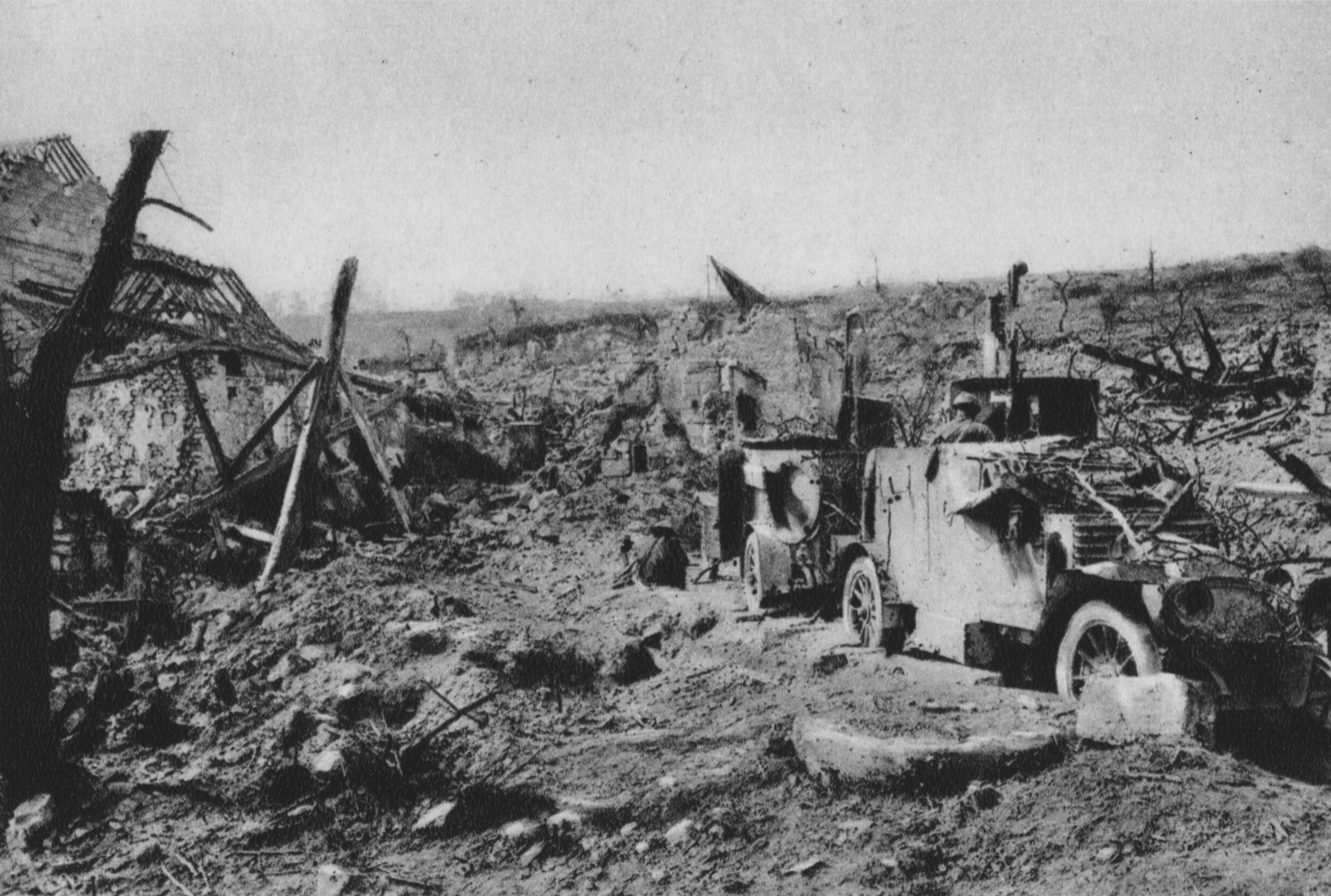
Renault Mle 1915 armoured car (automitrailleuse).

- Renault autocanon

The same Renault chassis and armoured body as the Mle 1915 but with a 37mm gun protected by a shield.

- Renault autoblindee

Renault AM with guns removed and used as unarmed transports. Some early AM had been fitted with single 8 mm Lebel St Étienne 1907 light machine gun for use as mobile anti-aircraft weapons. They had proved not to be effective in this role and were disarmed.
