= Boirault machine =

Boirault machine (No. 1)
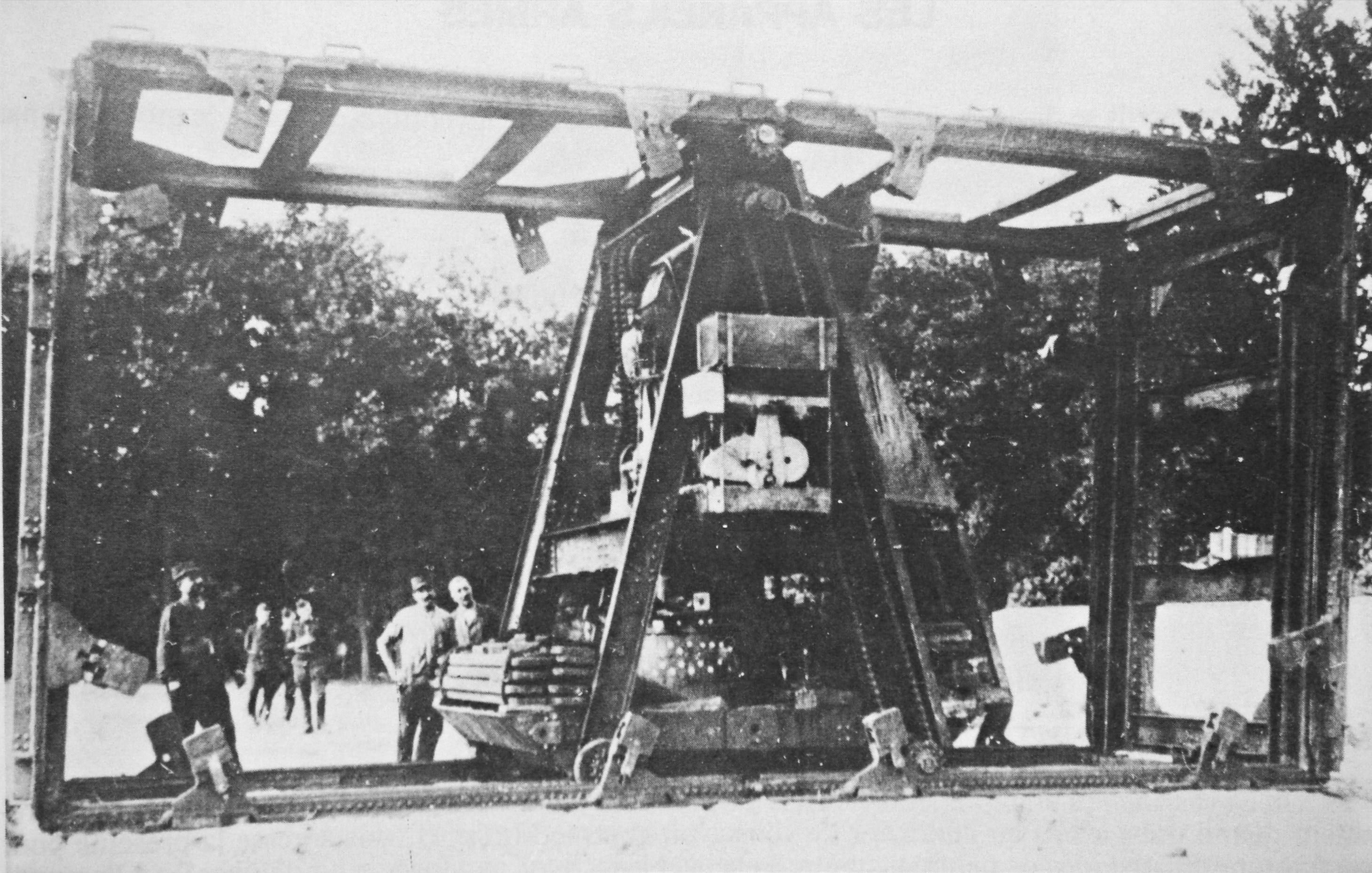
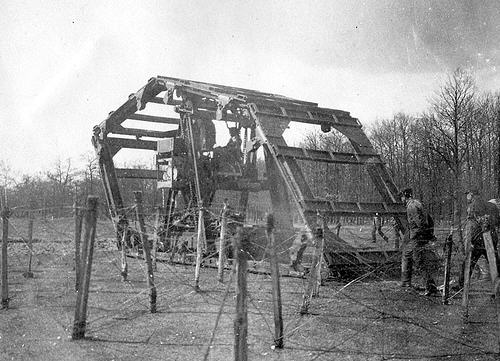
- Top:The Boirault machine used a huge rotating frame around a motorized center. Bottom: Boirault machine underway.
- Place of origin: (France) French Third Republic

Service history
- In service: January 1915–November 1915 (experimental)
- Wars: World War I

Production history
- Designer: Boirault
- Designed: 1914
- Produced: January 1915
- No. built: 1

Specifications
- Mass: 30 tonnes
- Length: 8.00 m
- Width: 3.00 m
- Height: 4.00 m
- Crew: 2
- Engine: petrol 80hp
- Maximum speed: 3 km/h

The Boirault machine (French: Appareil Boirault), was an early French experimental landship, designed in 1914 and built in early 1915. It has been considered as "another interesting ancestor of the tank", and described as a "rhomboid-shaped skeleton tank without armour, with single overhead track". Ultimately, the machine was deemed impractical and was nicknamed Diplodocus militaris, after a Sauropod from the Jurassic. It preceded the design and development of the English Little Willie tank by six months.

== Background ==
The immobility of the trench warfare characterizing the First World War led to a need for a powerfully armed military engine that would be at the same time protected from enemy fire and could move on the extremely irregular terrain of battlefields.

As early as 24 August 1914, the French colonel Jean Baptiste Eugène Estienne articulated the vision of a cross-country armoured vehicle:

"Victory in this war will belong to the belligerent who is the first to put a cannon on a vehicle capable of moving on all kinds of terrain"

— Colonel Jean Baptiste Estienne, 24 August 1914.

== Development ==
=== First Boirault machine ===
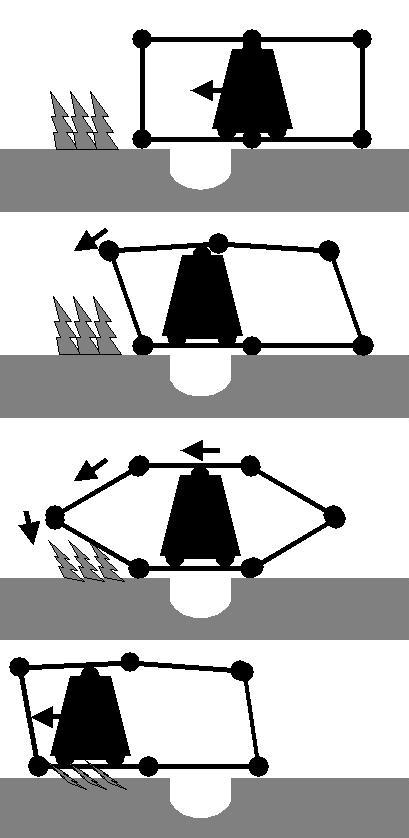
Schematical advance of a Boirault machine over a hole in the ground and a barbed wire barrier.

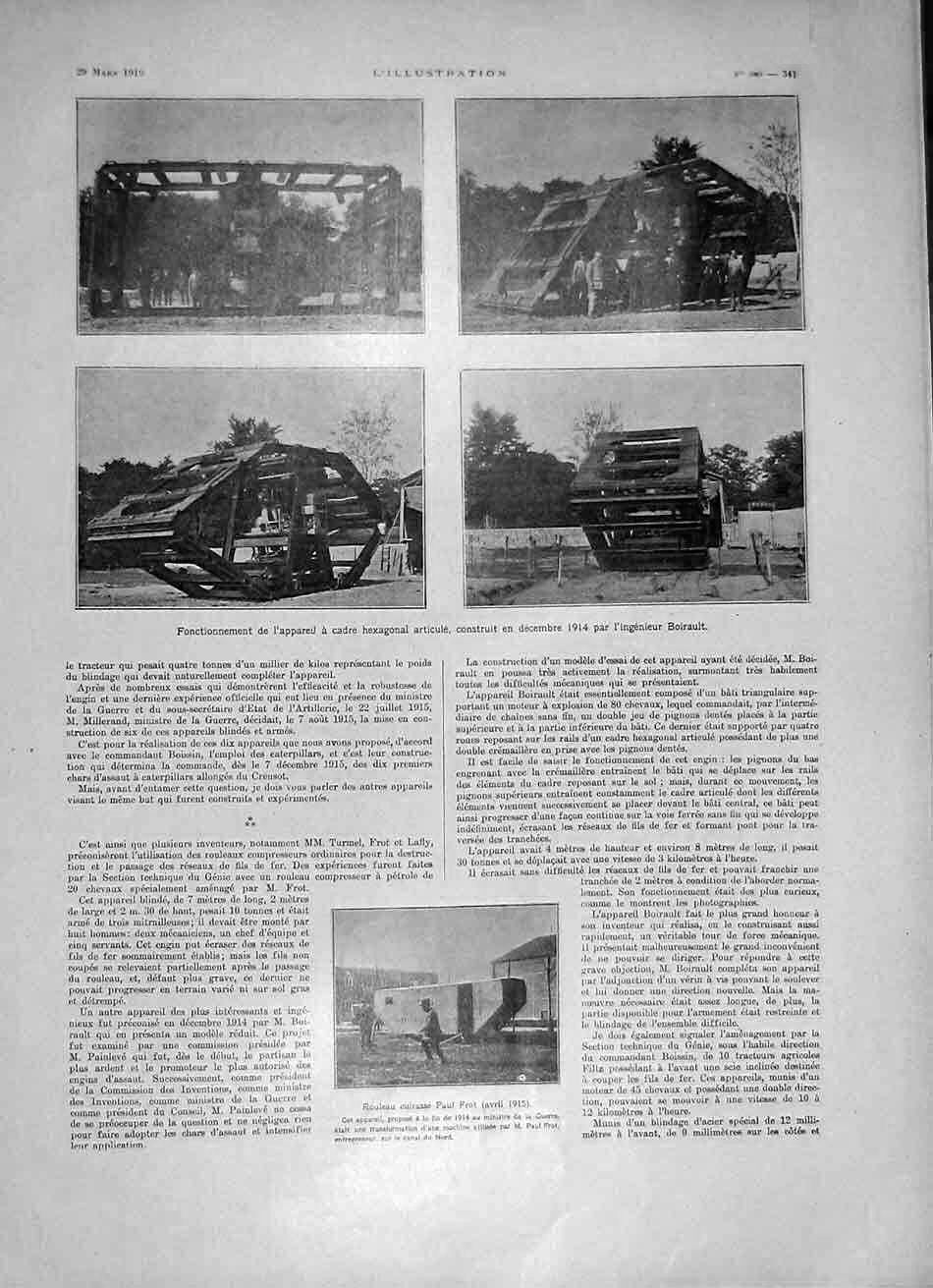
The first Boirault machine in this post-war L'Illustration in 1919. The bottom photograph is the Frot-Laffly landship.

One of the first attempts was made in France with the early experiment made with the Boirault machine, developed in 1914 by French engineer Louis Boirault, proposed to the French War Ministry in December 1914, and ordered for construction on 3 January 1915. On 19 January a commission, headed by Sub-secretary of State of Inventions Paul Painlevé, was formed to evaluate the project.

The objective of the machine was flattening barbed wire defences and riding over gaps in a battlefield. The machine was made of huge parallel tracks, formed by six 4x3 meter metallic frames, each with four transverse beams, so that it could also be described as a single track covering the entire width of the vehicle, rotating around a triangular motorized center, and driven via chains and rods by an 80 hp petrol engine.

This device proved too fragile and slow however, as well as incapable of changing direction easily, as was indicated by a report on 17 May. The project was officially abandoned on 10 June 1915. Upon the insistence of the inventor, modifications were made, a new commission was formed and new trials organized on 4 November 1915, for the benefit of the Engineer Arm. The machine, loaded with nine tonnes of simulation weights, successfully flattened an eight metre wide barbed wire obstacle, overcame a funnel with a diameter of five metres and crossed a trench two metres wide. It reached a speed of 1,6 km/h. A second test on 13 November showed however that it was still extremely difficult to change direction. The whole assembly had to be lifted by a main jack, after which it could be turned for a maximum of 45° by hand from the outside or by a system of smaller jacks from the inside of the machine. Again the project was rejected, because of its visibility, noise, vulnerability, low speed and lack of manoeuvrability. Military historian Lieutenant-Colonel André Duvignac concluded that those that had baptised it Diplodocus militaris (after a giant sauropod dinosaur, well known at the period) "were not only poor humorists but also good judges".

=== Second Boirault machine ===
Boirault machine (No2)
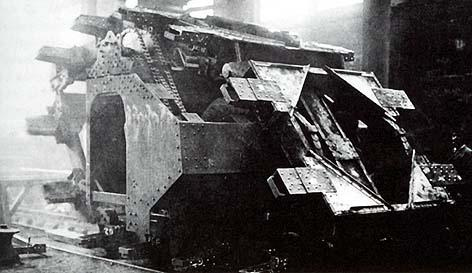
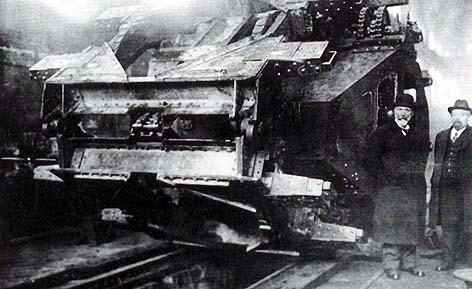
- Second Boirault machine, with Paul Boirault standing (bottom).
- Place of origin: France

Service history
- In service: August 1916 (experimental)
- Wars: World War I

Production history
- Designer: Boirault
- Designed: 1915–1916
- No. built: 1

Specifications
- Crew: 3 (estimated)
- Maximum speed: 1 km/h

A new model was developed, more compact and lighter, with armour for the engine and the driver compartment. It was composed of six metal plates rotating around the core chassis, and had some level of steering control, allowing for a turning radius of 100 meters. Speed however was extremely low, at 1 km/h. The new model was tried by the Artillery Arm on 17 August 1916 at Souain-Perthes-lès-Hurlus, until complete abandonment of the project.

General Henri Gouraud commented on the performance of the machine on 20 August 1916, explaining that it ran for 1,500 meters in flat terrain, at about 1 km/h. It managed to cross a railroad, flatten a line of barbed wire, and crossed trenches 1.5 and 1.8 meters wide, and a hole two meters in diameter.

General Gouraud commented on the sheer strength of the machine, but its poor ability to properly steer itself:

The steering is imprecise (...) Consequently, while the machine is capable of flattening everything in its path, it cannot be affirmed that it will be able to meet with certainty any given enemy organisation of limited dimensions that may be assigned to it, such as a bunker, machine gun housing, observatory... The trials, conducted far from the enemy, on a training ground, under conditions that in no way reflect reality, are far from conclusive."

— General Gouraud, 20 August 1916.

== Aftermath ==
The project was abandoned, as regular tanks were being developed. A few months before, in October 1914, the French arms manufacturer Schneider & Co. had already sent out its chief designer, Eugène Brillié, to investigate tracked tractors from the American Holt Company, at that time participating in a test programme in England. This Schneider program was met with approval by the French War Ministry and was merged with the Estienne plan, and a production order of 400 Schneider CA1, the first French tank to see the battlefield, was made on 25 February 1916.

== See also ==
- History of the tank
