= Frot-Laffly armoured roller =

Armoured fighting vehicle in early WWI, a precursor to the tank

Frot-Laffly roller
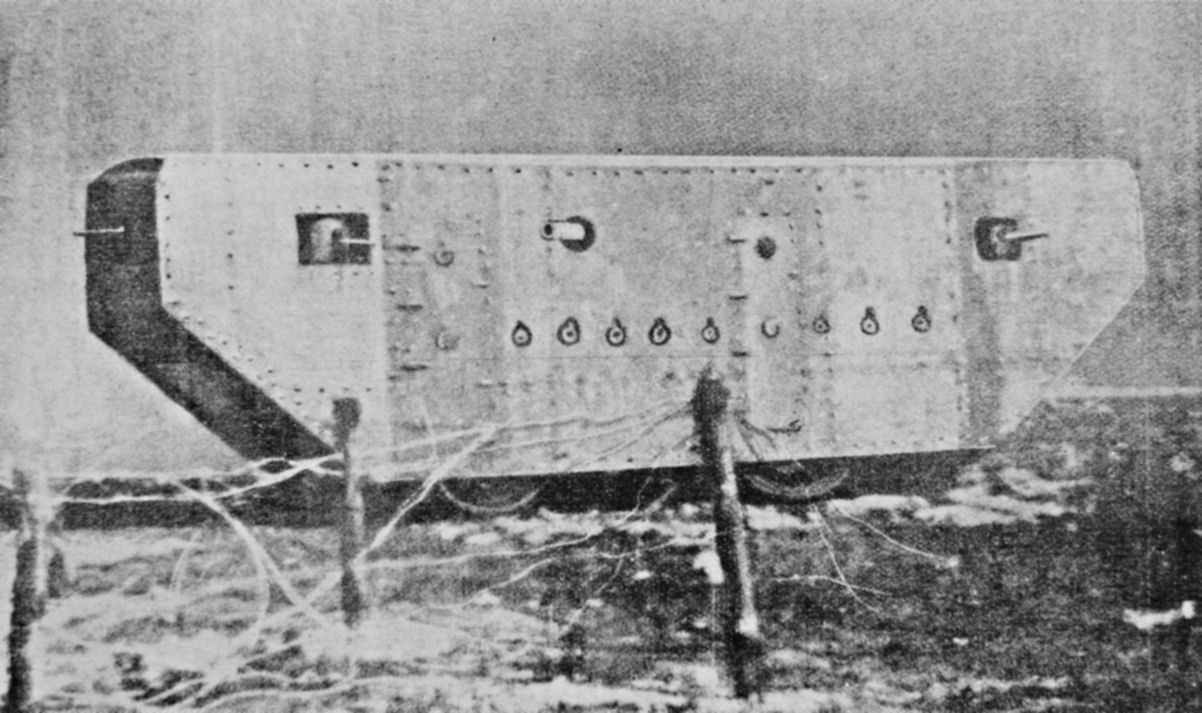
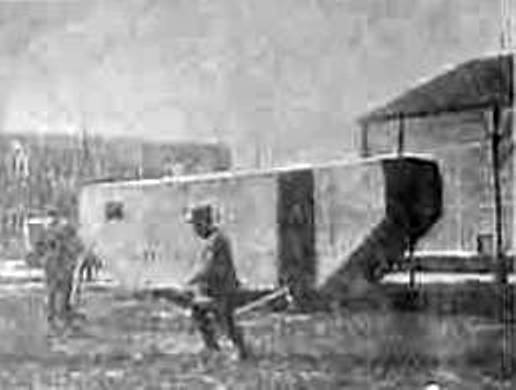
- Top: Frot-Laffly roller, tested on 28 March 1915 in France. Bottom: "Rouleau cuirassé Paul Frot" in L'Illustration.
- Type: Armoured fighting vehicle
- Place of origin: French Third Republic

Service history
- In service: March 1915 (experimental)

Production history
- Designer: Paul Frot
- Designed: December 1914
- Manufacturer: Laffly
- Produced: Early 1915
- No. built: 1

Specifications
- Mass: 10 tonnes
- Length: 7.00 m
- Width: 2.00 m
- Height: 2.30 m
- Crew: 9
- Armor: 7 mm
- Main armament: 4 machine guns
- Engine: gasoline internal combustion engine 20 hp
- Fuel capacity: 30 liters
- Operational range: one day operation
- Maximum speed: 3–5 km/h

The Frot-Laffly armoured roller, also Frot-Turmel-Laffly armoured roller (French: Char Frot-Turmel-Laffly, also Rouleau cuirassé Paul Frot), was an early French experimental armoured fighting vehicle designed and built from December 1914 to March 1915.

== Background ==
The immobility of the trench warfare characterizing the First World War led to a need for a powerful armed military engine that would be protected from enemy fire at the same time, and could move on the extremely irregular terrain of battlefields.

As early as 24 August 1914, the French colonel Jean Baptiste Estienne articulated the vision of a cross-country armoured vehicle:

Victory in this war will belong to the belligerent who is the first to put a cannon on a vehicle capable of moving on all kinds of terrain.

— Colonel Jean Baptiste Estienne, 24 August 1914.

== Development ==
One of the first attempts was made in France on 1 December 1914, when Paul Frot, an engineer in canal construction at the Compagnie Nationale du Nord, proposed to the French War Ministry a design for a vehicle with armour and armament, based on the motorization of a Laffly road roller with heavy fluted wheels that had been developed from 1912 and had been used to compact canals:

This rolling fortress, which only cannon could stop, would force our enemies to adopt another tactic, and anyway would give us a marked momentary advantage.

— Letter of Paul Frot to the French War Ministry, Les Sables d'Olonne, 1 December 1914.

The vehicle was fitted with 7 mm armour, was powered by a 20 hp gasoline internal combustion engine, and was able to move both forward and backward, with two driver positions, one at the front and the other at the back. It was to be equipped with machine guns on raised platforms attached to the compactor chassis: one in front, one in the rear, and two projecting from the sides for 360 degrees coverage. This armament was never actually fitted: the gun shields in the pictures are the result of retouching. The retouched photographs seem to indicate two cannon and six machine guns. Total length was 7 metres, width 2 metres, height 2.3 metres. It weighed a little under 10 tons. It would have been manned by a crew of nine: one commander, two mechanics and six gunners. Speed varied between 3 and 5 km/h.

The compactor base was built by the Laffly Company, at Boulogne sur Seine using a modified Laffly Type LT, and the armour was made by Corpet Company, at La Courneuve. The tank was tested on 28 March 1915 in the grounds of the Corpet & Louvet factory, and effectively destroyed barbed wire lines and climbed a 25% slope, but was deemed lacking mobility:

The trials of this machine have demonstrated that it would not be possible to obtain practically satisfying results from it.

— Letter from Colonel Mourral, Chef de Section technique du Genie, to Paul Frot, Paris, 10 April 1915.

== Aftermath ==
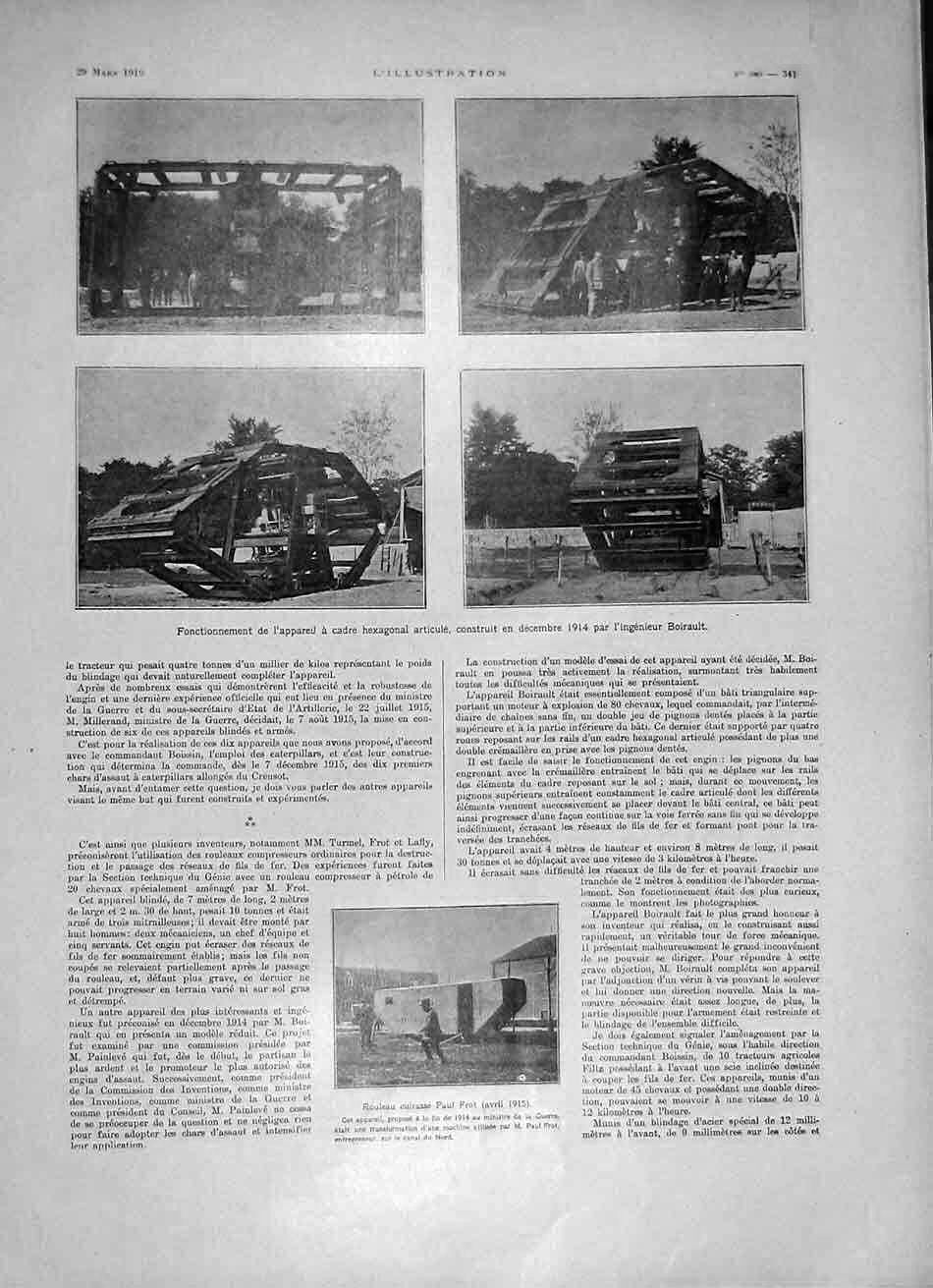
A post-war L'Illustration (1919), showing the Boirault machine (top) and the Frot-Laffly landship (bottom).

The project was abandoned in favour of General Estienne's concurrent project of a tank using a tractor base, codenamed Tracteur Estienne, which was being developed at that time.

A few months before, in January 1915, the French arms manufacturer Schneider & Co. had already sent out its chief designer, Eugène Brillié, to investigate tracked tractors from the American Holt Company, at that time participating in a test programme in England. This Schneider program was met with approbation of the French War Ministry, was merged with the Estienne plan, and a production order of 400 Schneider CA1, the first French tank to see the battlefield, was made on 25 February 1916.

The prototype of the Frot-Laffly was sold to the United Kingdom, Paul Frot claiming in a letter dated 8 January 1918 that it had influenced British tank design.

== See also ==
- History of the tank
