= Little Willie =

British prototype armoured tank

Coordinates: 50.69430°N 2.24317°W

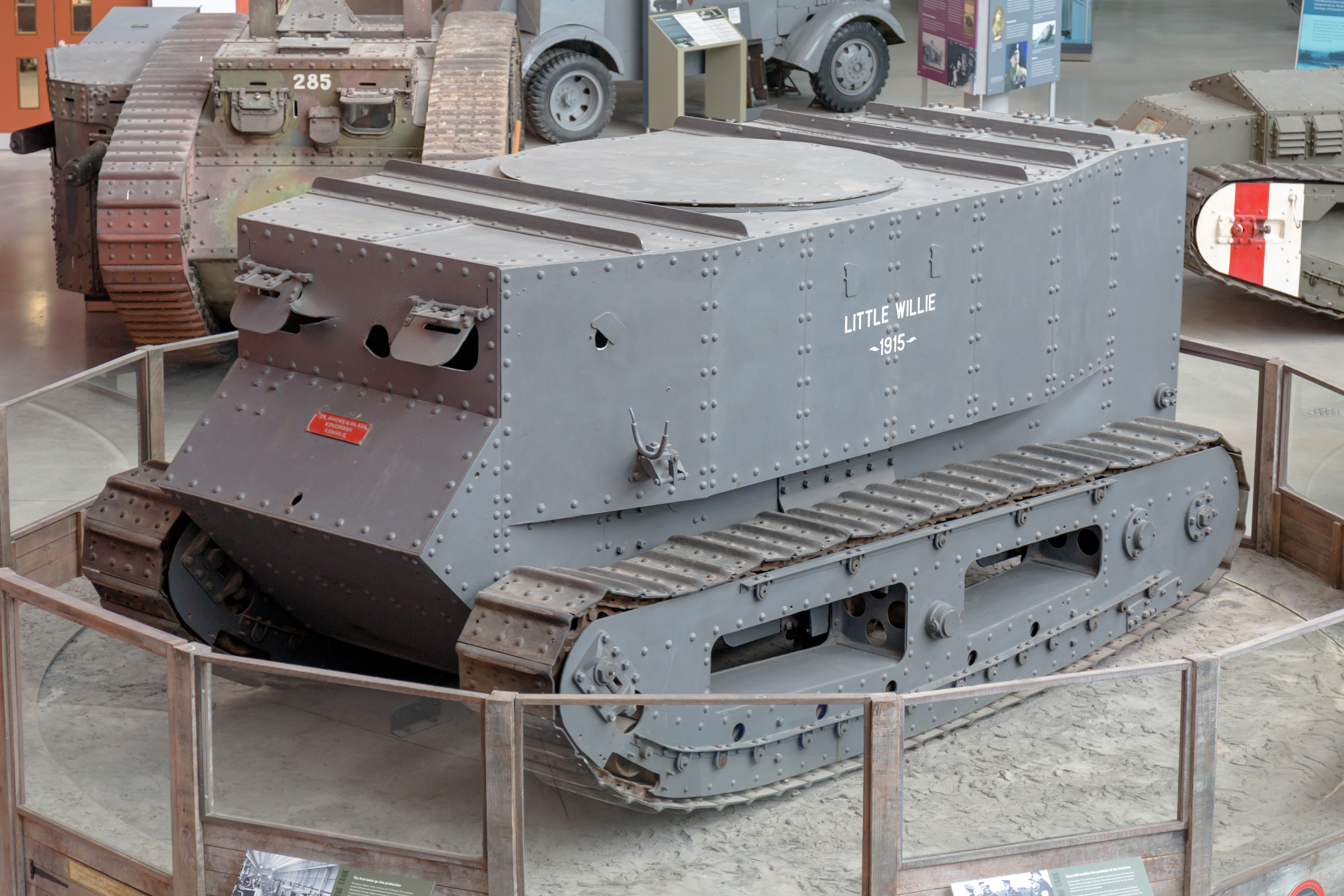
- Little Willie at the Tank Museum, Bovington (2017)
- Type: Prototype tank
- Place of origin: United Kingdom

Service history
- In service: N/A

Production history
- Designed: July 1915
- Manufacturer: Fosters of Lincoln
- Produced: August–September 1915
- No. built: 1

Specifications
- Mass: 16.5 tonnes (16.2 long tons; 18.2 short tons)
- Length: 19 ft 3 in (5.87 m) 26 ft 6 in (8.08 m) inc. rear steering wheels
- Width: 9 ft 5 in (2.87 m)
- Height: 8 ft 3 in (2.51 m) to top of hull 10 ft 2 in (3.10 m) to top of turret
- Crew: (Projected) 6
- Main armament: (Projected) Vickers 2-pounder (40 mm) gun
- Secondary armament: (Projected) Various suggestions of Maxim, Hotchkiss, Lewis, or Madsen machine guns
- Engine: Foster-Daimler Knight sleeve valve petrol 105 hp (78 kW)
- Power/weight: 6 hp/tonne (4.5 kW/tonne)
- Transmission: Two-speed forwards, one reverse final drive by Renolds chains
- Suspension: Unsprung
- Maximum speed: 2 mph (3.2 km/h)

Little Willie is a prototype in the development of the British Mark I tank. Constructed in the autumn of 1915 at the behest of the Landship Committee, it was the first completed tank prototype in history. Little Willie is the oldest surviving individual tank, and is preserved as one of the most famous pieces in the collection of The Tank Museum, Bovington, England.

== Number 1 Lincoln Machine ==
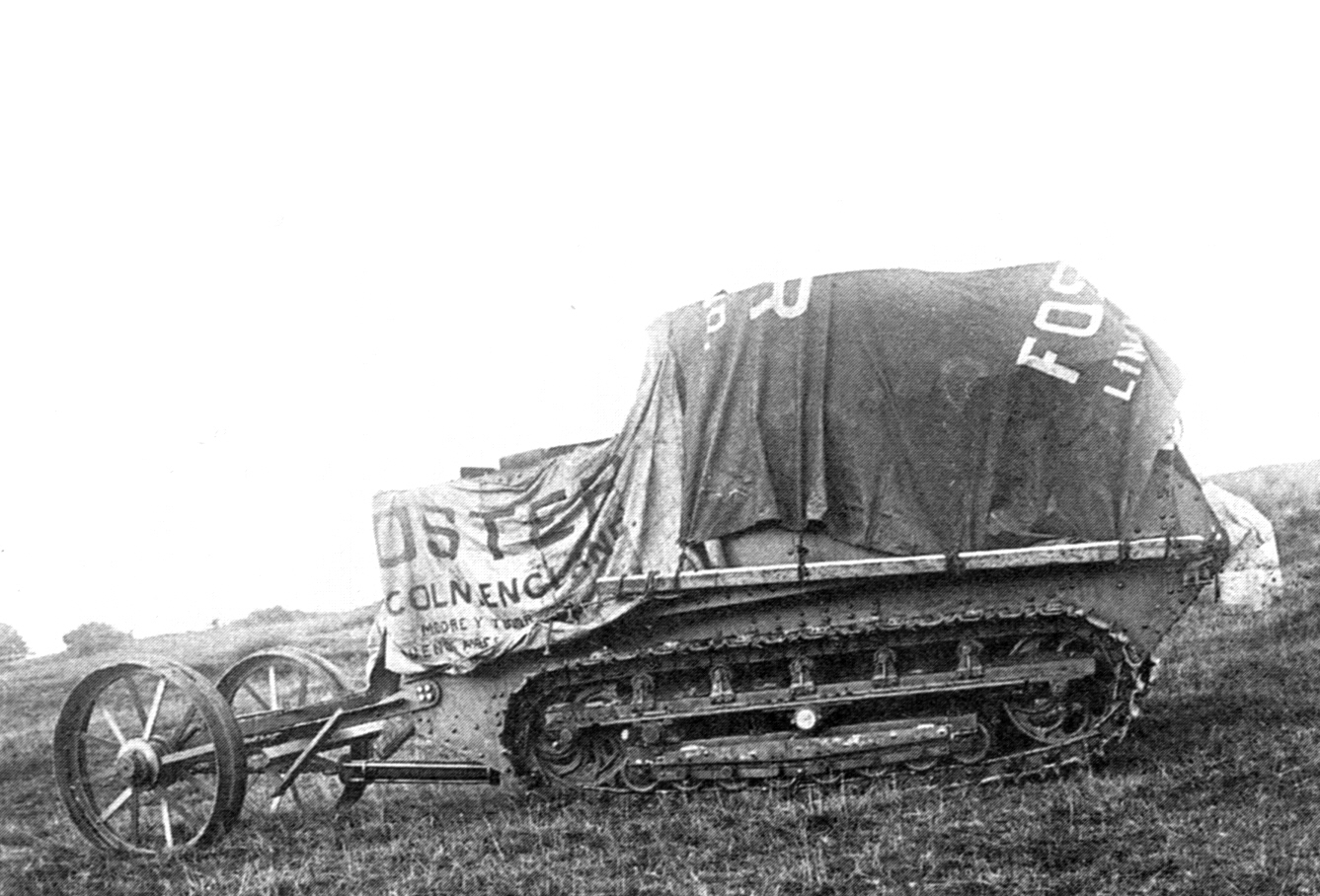
The No1 Lincoln Machine, with lengthened Bullock tracks and Creeping Grip tractor suspension, September 1915

Work on Little Willie's predecessor began in July 1915 by the Landship Committee to meet The United Kingdom's requirement in World War I for an armoured combat vehicle able to cross an 8-foot (2.4 m) trench. After several other projects where single and triple tracks had failed, on 22 July William Ashbee Tritton, director of the agricultural machinery company William Foster & Company of Lincoln, was given the contract to develop a "Tritton Machine" with two tracks. It had to make use of the track assemblies – lengthened tracks and suspension elements (seven road wheels instead of four) – purchased as fully built units from the Bullock Creeping Grip Tractor Company in Chicago.

On 11 August actual construction began; on 16 August Tritton decided to fit a wheeled tail to assist in steering. On 9 September the Number 1 Lincoln Machine, as the prototype was then known, made its first test run in the yard of the Wellington Foundry. It soon became clear that the track profiles were so flat that ground resistance during a turn was excessive. To solve this, the suspension was changed so that the bottom profile was more curved. Then the next problem showed up: when crossing a trench the track sagged and then would not fit the wheels again and jammed. The tracks were also not up to carrying the weight of the vehicle (about 16 tons). Tritton and Lieutenant Walter Gordon Wilson tried several types of alternative track design, including balatá belting and flat wire ropes. Tritton, on 22 September, devised a robust but outwardly crude system using pressed steel plates riveted to cast links and incorporated guides to engage on the inside of the track frame. The track frames as a whole were connected to the main body by large spindles.

New arrival by Tritton out of pressed plate.
Light in weight but very strong.
All doing well, Thank you.
Proud Parents

This system was unsprung, as the tracks were held firmly in place, able to move in only one plane. This was a successful design and was used on all First World War British tanks up to the Mark VIII, although it limited speed.

== Description ==
The vehicle's 13 litre 105 bhp (78 kW) Daimler-Knight engine, gravity fed by two petrol tanks, was at the back, leaving just enough room beneath the turret. The prototype was fitted with a non-rotatable dummy turret mounting a machine gun; a Vickers 2-pounder (40 mm) Maxim gun ("Pom-pom") was to have been fitted, with as many as six Madsen machine guns to supplement it. The main gun would have had a large ammunition store with 800 rounds. Stern suggested to Tritton that the gun could be made to slide forward on rails, giving a better field of fire, but in the event the turret idea was abandoned and the aperture for the crew plated over. In the front of the vehicle two men sat on a narrow bench; one controlling the steering wheel, the clutch, the primary gear box and the throttle; the other holding the brakes. Overall length of the final version with the lengthened tracks and rear steering wheels in place was 8.08 m (26 ft 6 in). The length of the main unit without the rear steering wheels installed is 5.87 m (19 ft 3 in).

Most mechanical components, including the radiator, had been adapted from those of the Foster-Daimler heavy artillery tractor. As at least four men would have been required to operate the armament, the crew could not have been smaller than six. The maximum speed was indicated by Tritton as being no more than two miles per hour. The vehicle used no real armour steel, just boiler plate; it was intended to use 10 mm plating for production.

== Little Willie and Big Willie ==
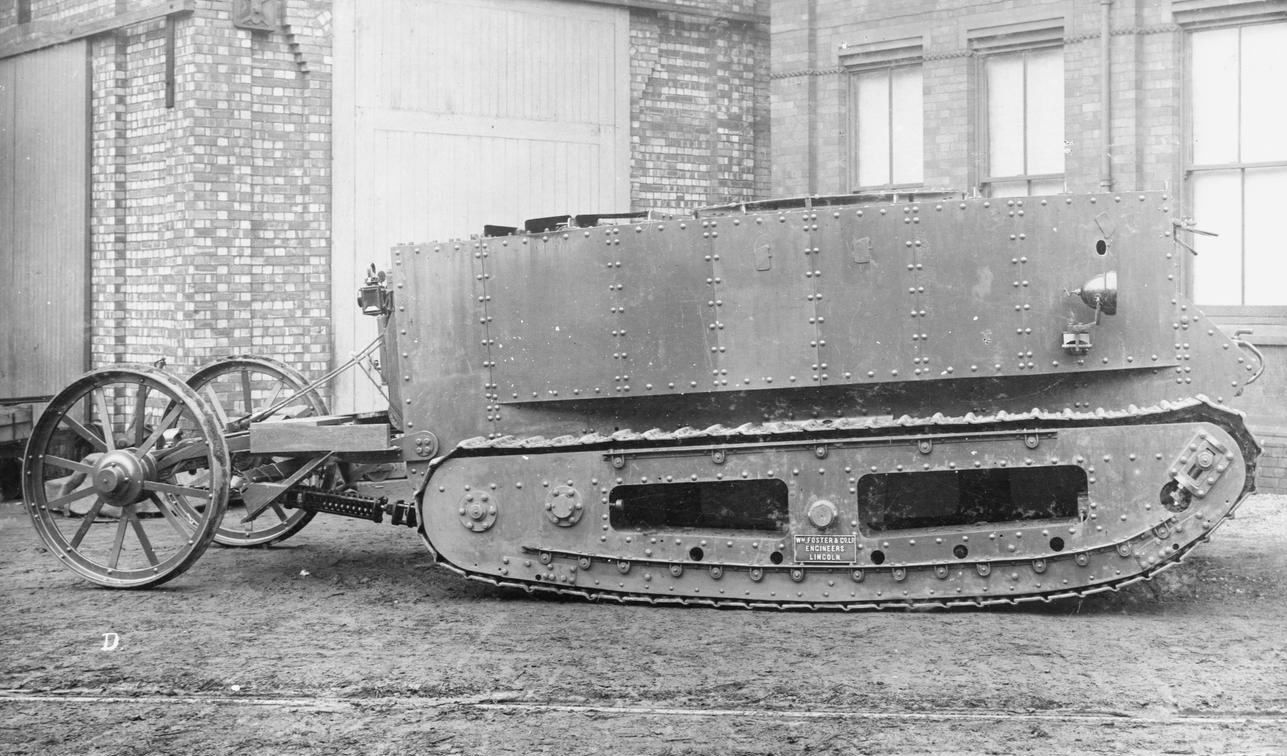
Little Willie showing its rear steering wheels, September 1915

Wilson was unhappy with the basic concept of the Number 1 Lincoln Machine, and on 17 August suggested to Tritton the idea of using tracks that ran all around the vehicle. With d'Eyncourt's approval construction of an improved prototype began on 17 September. For this second prototype (later known as "HMLS [His Majesty's Land Ship] Centipede", and, later still, "Mother"), a rhomboid track frame was fitted, taking the tracks up and over the top of the vehicle. The rear steering wheels were retained in an improved form, but the idea of a turret was abandoned and the main armament placed in side sponsons.

Number 1 Lincoln Machine was rebuilt with an extended (90 centimetres longer) track up to 6 December 1915, but merely to test the new tracks in Burton Park, near Lincoln; the second prototype was seen as much more promising. The first was renamed Little Willie, the scabrous name then commonly used by the British yellow press to mock the German Imperial Crown Prince Wilhelm; Mother was for a time known as Big Willie, after his father Emperor Wilhelm II of Germany. That same year the cartoonist William Kerridge Haselden had made a popular comic anti-German propaganda movie: The Adventures of Big and Little Willie. Although Little Willie was demonstrated alongside Mother in January 1916, it was by then peripheral to the development of British tanks.

In June 1916 the tank was transferred to the tank training area near Elveden. After a period at the training area it sent back to its original manufactures who may have used it for tests relating to the development of the whippet tank. By 1925 it was at Bovington.

Though it never saw combat, Little Willie was a major step forward in military technology, being the first tank prototype to be finished. (Note: The development of the similar French Schneider CA1 started earlier in January 1915, but its first real prototype was only made in February 1916) During the remainder of World War I, some tank crews continued to informally refer to their vehicles as "Willies" or "buses". In 1922 the Royal Tank Regiment adopted a folk song called My Boy Willie as its regimental march.

== Today ==
Little Willie was preserved for posterity after the war, having been saved from being scrapped in 1940. During the Second World War it may have been positioned to act as a pill box to defend the camp at Bovington. It is today displayed at The Tank Museum at Bovington. It is essentially an empty hull, without an engine, but still with some internal fittings. The rear steering wheels are not fitted and there is damage to the hull plating around the right–hand vision slit, possibly caused by an attempt at some point to tow the vehicle by passing a cable through the slit. This would have torn the tank's comparatively thin steel plating.
