= Delaunay-Belleville armoured car =

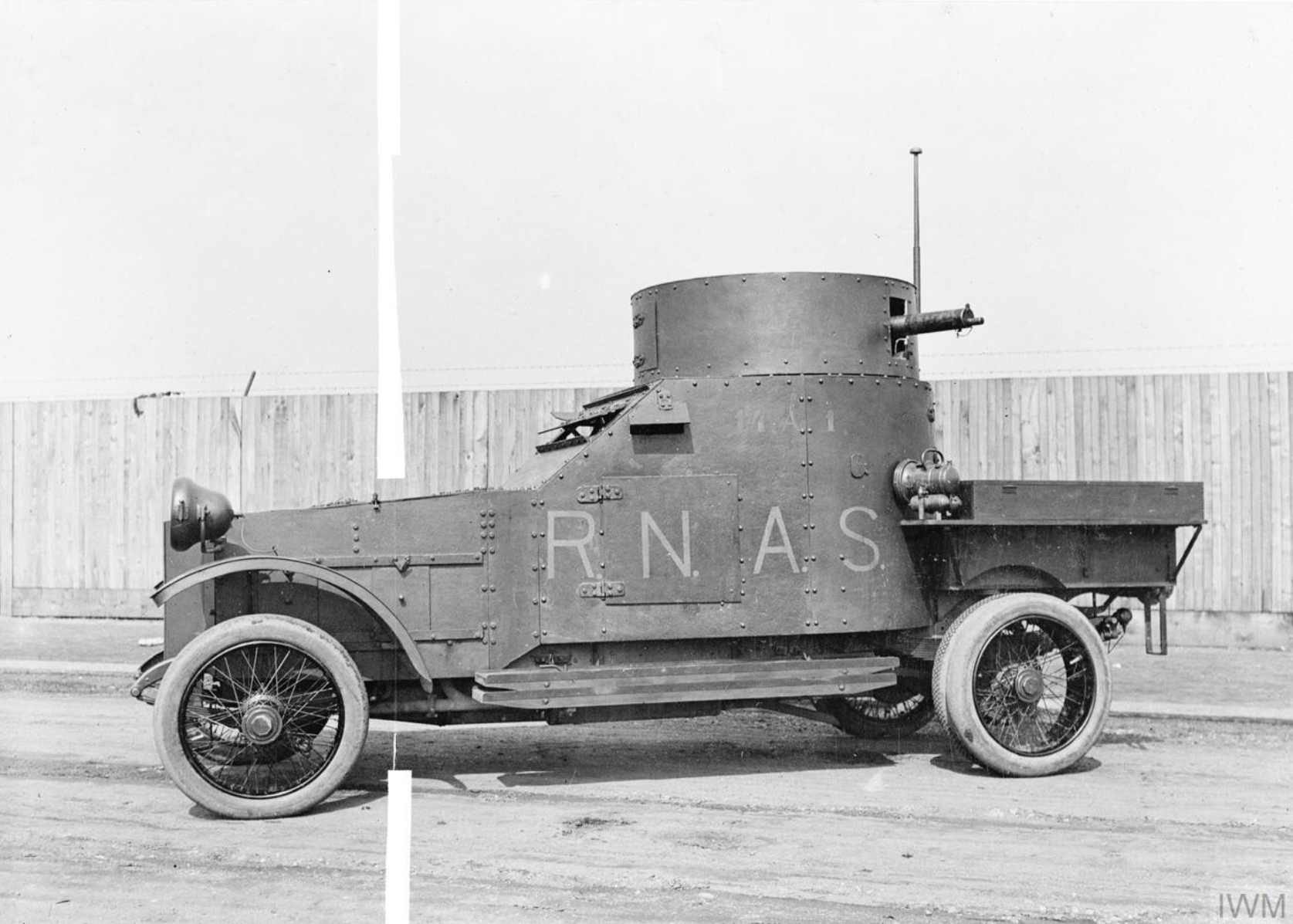
- Type: Armoured car
- Place of origin: United Kingdom & France

Service history
- In service: 1914–1918
- Used by: Royal Naval Air Service
- Wars: First World War

Production history
- Produced: 1914
- No. built: 3

Specifications
- Crew: 3
- Main armament: .303 in (7.7 mm) Vickers machine gun
- Engine: 6-cylinder 40 hp (30 kW)
- Drive: Wheeled 4x2
- References: Fletcher & Foss.

The Delaunay-Belleville armoured car was a British armoured car built on the chassis of the luxury French Delaunay-Belleville tourer. It saw service with the Royal Naval Air Service in the early years of the First World War.

== Design ==
The Delaunay-Belleville armoured car was a turreted armoured car, built on the chassis of a Delaunay-Belleville luxury tourer. The layout of the Delaunay-Belleville was similar to the Rolls-Royce armoured car although larger, with an engine (likely six-cylinder 40 hp (30 kW)) at the front, crew compartment in the middle and rear cargo deck. The Delaunay-Belleville’s flat topped circular turret was fitted with a .303 Vickers machine gun, whilst a door was on the left side for crew access.

The Delaunay-Bellevilles were amongst the earliest armoured vehicles to have overhead protection for the crew.

== History ==
In 1914 the Admiralty acquired three bare Delaunay-Belleville chassis in Britain awaiting delivery to coach builders, to convert to armoured cars.

The armoured bodywork of the Delaunay-Belleville was built and fitted at the behest of Charles Samson, who was unhappy with the early open topped Admiralty designs. The turret was probably designed by Arthur Nickerson, the designer of the Rolls-Royce turret.

It is possible that the armoured bodywork of the Delaunay-Belleville was built and fitted by the firm Forges et Chantiers de France of Dunkirk, although that firm had no access to armour plate so if that were the case they were built from boiler plate.

== Service ==
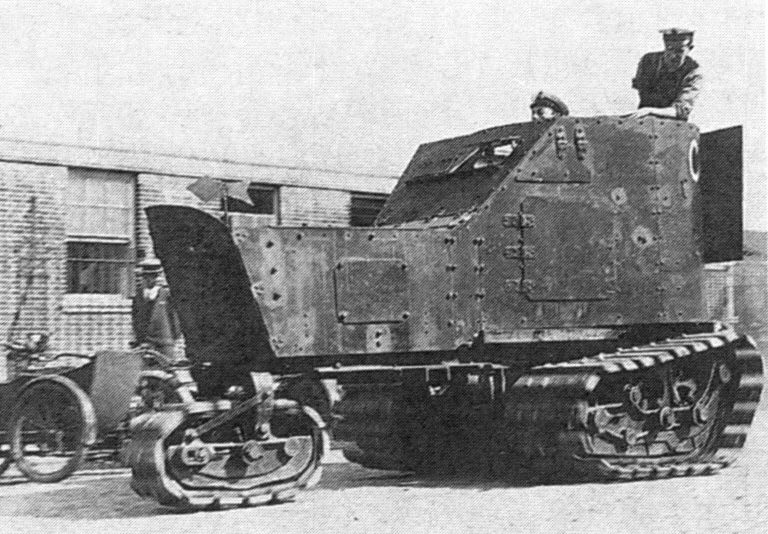
Killen-Strait experimental armoured tractor, fitted with a Delaunay-Belleville body.

The Delaunay-Bellevilles formed part of the Royal Naval Armoured Car Division in France. Upon his return to Britain, Samson took a number of armoured cars with him, including the Delaunay-Bellevilles. They were assigned to 14 Squadron of the Royal Naval Air Service Armoured Car Division based at Barlby Road, North Kensington, the Headquarters of the Royal Naval Armoured Car Division. In 14 Squadron they served alongside three Talbot armoured cars, six Rolls-Royces and three Seabrook armoured lorries.

Two of the Delaunay-Bellevilles remained as they were throughout the war, the third had its armoured bodywork removed in 1915 and was converted into a tender. The armoured body, without the turret, was fitted to the chassis of an imported American tracked Killen-Strait tractor. The Killen-Strait armoured tractor became the first tracked armoured vehicle, participating in a number of tank trials in 1915.

== See also ==
- List of combat vehicles of World War I
