= Killen-Strait armoured tractor =

British experimental armoured tractor

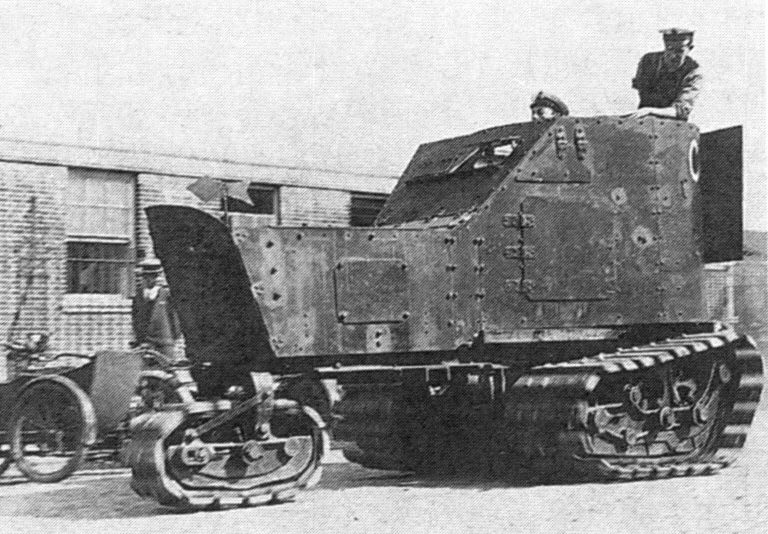
- Type: Experimental armoured tractor
- Place of origin: United States; Great Britain

Production history
- Designer: Killen-Strait; RNAS Armoured Car Section
- Produced: 30 June, 1915
- No. built: 1

The Killen-Strait armoured tractor was an experimental armoured tractor constructed by the United Kingdom in 1915. The vehicle consisted of the superstructure from a Delaunay-Belleville armoured car, with the turret removed, fitted on a tractor produced by the American company Killen-Strait. A predecessor to the Little Willie, the vehicle is sometimes described as the first tracked armoured vehicle.

== History ==
In February 1915, the Landship Committee was formed under instructions by First Lord of the Admiralty Winston Churchill to develop armoured fighting vehicles for use on the Western Front. R. E. B. Crompton, the appointed technical adviser of the committee, was tasked with producing "alternative designs for the wheeled and tracked machines." However, no reliable tracks were available in Britain at the time, and an officer was sent to the United States to locate suitable tracked vehicles.

Between February and April, the Admiralty was contacted by the London agent of the American Killen Strait Manufacturing Company. The company, based in Appleton, Wisconsin, advised the Admiralty that a lightweight chain tractor, along with William Strait from the company, had arrived in the United Kingdom and hoped to give a demonstration. This information was forwarded to Crompton and a viewing was arranged. On 27 April, William Strait and the tractor arrived at the Clément-Talbot works for testing. Crompton was impressed with the vehicle's design and engineering, and purchased the vehicle for £800.

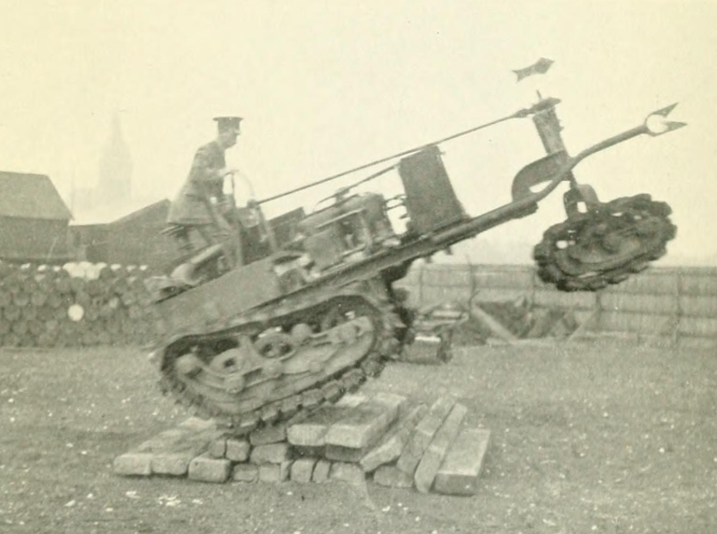
The Killen-Strait tractor (without armour), demonstrating its obstacle-crossing abilities, 1915.

On 30 June, the Landship Committee held a demonstration at the recreation ground adjoining the works to show its progress. The Killen-Strait tractor was one of the few vehicles available, and the demonstration was attended by Churchill, Minister of Munitions David Lloyd George, Lord Grosvenor, Director of Munitions Supply Sir Frederick Black, Maj Gen Ivor Philipps, Major General George Kenneth Scott-Moncrieff, Colonel Henry Holden and Head of Trench Warfare at the Ministry of Munitions Louis Jackson. The vehicle was driven by Thomas Gerard Hetherington into tensioned barbed wire, across dummy shell holes and small piles of railway sleepers. The vehicle demonstrated good mobility but was not able to breakthrough the barbed wire. After a short while, Lt Kenneth Symes fitted the turretless armoured bodywork from a Delaunay-Belleville armoured car onto the vehicle, creating the first tracked armoured vehicle. It was envisioned for this vehicle to join the RNAS Armoured Car Section, but this was not realized due to the unit's imminent disbandment. The vehicle was transferred to the RNAS Barrow Airship Station in September 1915, serving as a tow tractor there. The project itself was also abandoned, as the vehicle was unable to fulfil all-terrain warfare requirements and could not cross wide trenches. However, the trial would lead to the adoption of tracked propulsion for "Little Willie", the first prototype tank.

== Design ==
The vehicle consisted of three tracks. A front track was used for steering, while two tracks in the rear provided propulsion. The rear-facing side of the rear tracks tilted upwards, allowing the vehicle to climb obstacles when in reverse gear. It has been proposed that this innovative design inspired the rhomboid shape tracks of the later Mark I tank, though this claim is controversial.

== See also ==
- List of combat vehicles of World War I
