= Talbot armoured car =

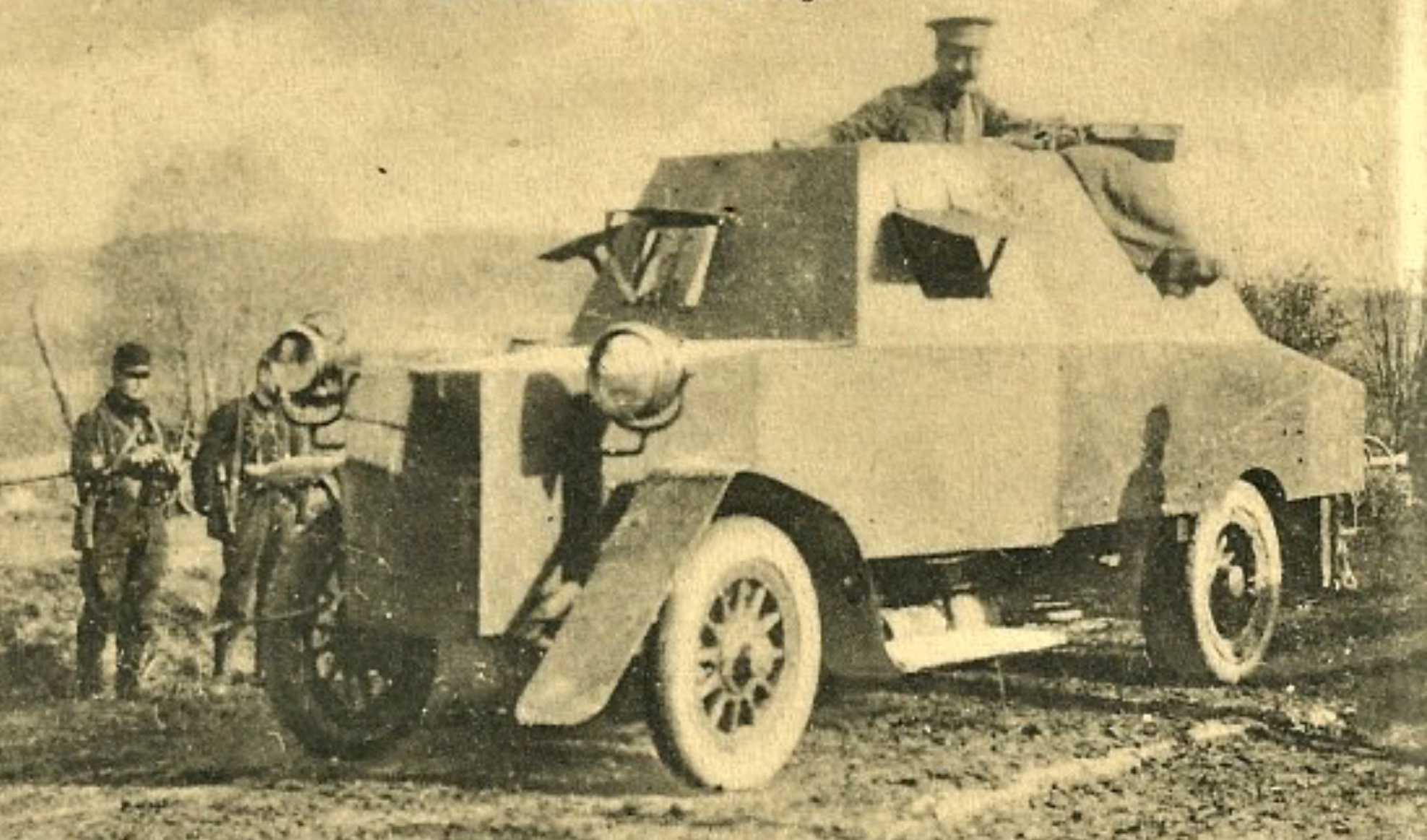
- Modified first Admiralty pattern
- Type: Armoured car
- Place of origin: United Kingdom

Service history
- In service: 1914–15
- Used by: Royal Naval Air Service
- Wars: First World War

Production history
- Manufacturer: Clément-Talbot, Forges et Chantiers de France

Specifications
- Mass: ≈ 4 long tons (4.1 t)
- Crew: 3
- Armour: 0.31 in (8 mm)
- Main armament: 1 or 2 .303 Maxim guns
- Engine: 4-cylinder 25 hp (19 kW)
- Drive: Wheeled 4x2
- Transmission: 4F1R
- References: Bartholomew, Foss & White

The Talbot armoured car was a British armoured car built on the chassis of a Clément-Talbot tourer. Built in small numbers to several patterns, the Talbot armoured cars saw service with the Royal Naval Air Service (R.N.A.S.) in the early years of the First World War, serving alongside Rolls-Royce and Delaunay-Belleville armoured cars.

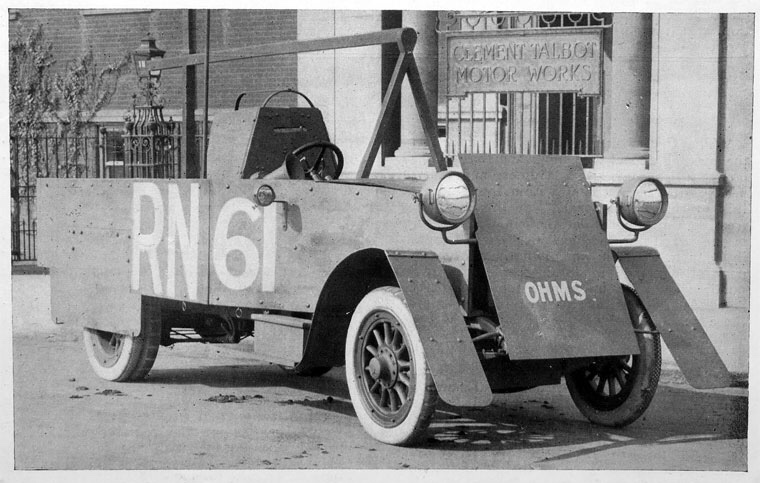
First Admiralty pattern

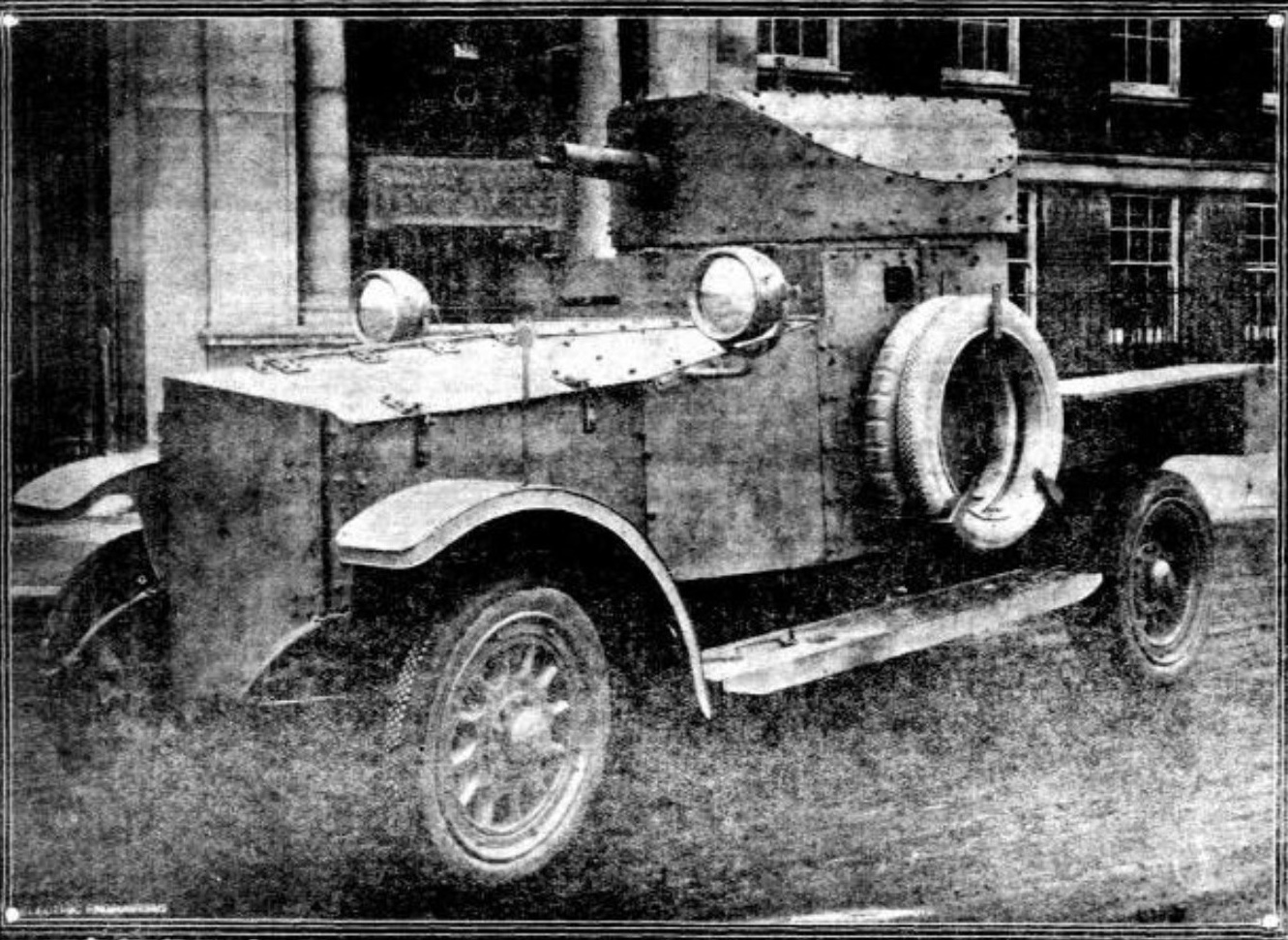
Admiralty turreted pattern

== Design ==
The Talbot armoured car came in several different patterns although all were built on the chassis of the Clément-Talbot 25/50 hp tourer. The 25/50 hp tourer had a 4x2 rear-wheel drive chassis, it was driven by a 4-cylinder 25 horsepower (19 kW) engine mated to a four-speed transmission, its original wheels were substituted for Warland dual-rim artillery-type wheels with twin rear wheels.

=== First Admiralty pattern ===
The original first Admiralty pattern Talbots were very similar to the first Admiralty pattern Wolseley and Rolls-Royce armoured cars. Weighing around 4 long tons (4.1 t) these vehicles were fitted with armoured plates 8 mm (0.31 in) thick that covered the sides and top of the engine and extending along the sides at dashboard height; they had an open rear fighting compartment in which crew members remained dangerously exposed to enemy fire unless they chose to lie on the floor, the driver being the only member of the crew completely protected, sitting under a box shaped armoured hood. The vehicles had shields over the rear wheels and a distinguishing large rectangular armoured radiator shield; designed to provide protection for the radiator, bonnet area and the driver to a degree, in service the shield obscured much of the driver's vision. The armament was one or two .303 Maxim guns mounted on pintle mounts on the offside and rear of the fighting compartment.

One of the original cars was up-armed with a QF 1-pounder pom-pom in a hull that was renovated to accommodate it. Some of these Talbots were not fitted with the driver's head cover and radiator shield and they seem to have been used to transport supplies.

=== Modified first Admiralty pattern ===
By November 1914 six first Admiralty pattern Talbot armoured cars were modified in France, they were broadly similar to the original except the radiator shield was substituted for superior side-opening doors, the rear wheel protection was removed and the rear armoured bodywork was built up around the open topped fighting compartment to shoulder height of standing occupants. The armament was either two .303 Maxim guns or a single Maxim gun and a gun shield.

=== Admiralty turreted pattern ===
In 1915 three Talbot armoured cars were produced to the new Admiralty turreted pattern, these armoured cars were very similar to the Rolls-Royce Admiralty turreted pattern with an armoured hull, two man turret and a rear cargo area; the Warland artillery-type wheels and slightly different radiator armour being the only distinguishing features.

== History ==
Following early successes using hastily armoured cars, it was decided Commander Charles Samson should be equipped with sixty armoured cars built in Britain utilising on the chassis of eighteen Rolls-Royce 40/50 hp, twenty one Wolseley 30 hp and twenty one Talbot 25/50 hp tourers. The Clément-Talbot company of North Kensington was originally formed to import French Clément cars into the United Kingdom, although the Talbot 25/50 hp of 1914 was entirely British designed and built.

The first Admiralty pattern armour scheme was a design by Lord Wimbourne and the Admiralty Air Department, a full sized wooden mockup was created on a Rolls-Royce chassis and testing of all three chassis types was conducted with equivalent weights to the proposed armour and a 30 hundredweight (1.5 t) load, the modifications deemed necessary were the fitting of new wheels and twin wheels at the rear. The armour was fitted to the first Admiralty pattern armoured cars at the Royal Navy Dockyards at Sheerness with the designs of the three makes varying only to accommodate the differences in the chassis, and the vehicles were in use by Samson's forces in France and Belgium by October 1914. Of the sixty armoured cars ordered the majority of Rolls-Royce chassis were diverted and it is believed only about fifteen armoured cars were delivered to France, the majority being Talbots.

First Admiralty pattern armoured cars were unpopular with their crews because the crew members in the fighting compartment were completely exposed from the waist up, so to incorporate lessons learned in combat by R.N.A.S. armoured car crews six modified first Admiralty pattern cars were created to increase crew protection, the modifications were conducted the firm Forges et Chantiers de France at Dunkirk under the supervision of Lieutenant F. R. Samson using armour plate dispatched from England by the Admiralty in October 1914. By the time they came into service in the first week of November 1914 most of the Western Front had descended into trench warfare and the opportunities for their employment were almost gone, so they were sent to the still open La Bassée area to be trialled in combat.

Still unhappy with the open-topped designs in service, Charles Samson had Forges et Chantiers de France build three prototype turreted armoured cars on the chassis of three luxury French Delaunay-Belleville tourers to the designs of Captain Arthur Nickerson, creating the Delaunay-Belleville armoured car, following this the Admiralty Air Department formed a committee to design a turreted armoured car based on the Rolls-Royce chassis. The first three Rolls-Royce Admiralty turreted pattern armoured cars were ready in December 1914 and in early 1915 three Talbot 25/50 hp chassis were fitted to virtually the same design. Tested in combat against the Rolls-Royce and newly created Lanchester armoured cars, the suspension of the Talbot was found to be too light for the armour, and no more were built, the three equipped part of one four car section in the R.N.A.S. Armoured Car Division, serving in the same squadron as the Delauney-Bellevilles. Later, due to the suspension problems, the remaining Talbots still in service had their armour removed and they were converted to logistics tenders, carrying supplies for the Rolls-Royce and Lanchester equipped armoured car squadrons, it is believed some of these tenders were still in service after the R.N.A.S. armoured cars were transferred to the British Army.

== See also ==
- List of combat vehicles of World War I
