= Thomas Gerard Hetherington =

British military officer (1886–1951)

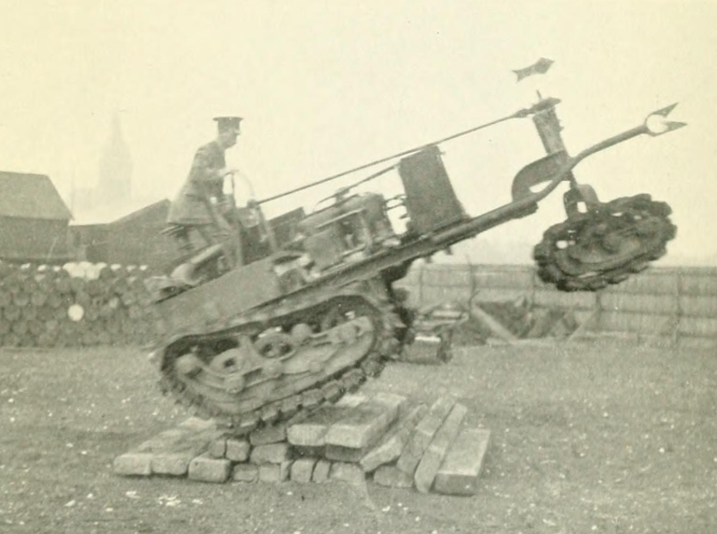
Demonstration of a Killen-Strait caterpillar tractor in 1915, probably being driven by Hetherington.

Group Captain Thomas Gerard Hetherington CBE (19 June 1886 – 14 October 1951) was a British officer who served in the British Army, Royal Navy and Royal Air Force. He was one of those credited with the initial development of the tank during the early part of the First World War. Although his design for an enormous wheeled vehicle proved to be impractical, it earned him a seat on the Landship Committee and he participated in early experiments with tracked vehicles.

== Early career ==
Educated at Harrow School, Hetherington's interest in mechanics led him to a three-year apprenticeship with the Maudslay Motor Company. Commissioned into the 18th Hussars, Hetherington had represented both the army and Great Britain in equestrian competitions, until an accident left him unable to ride, whereupon he took up flying. Having earned the Royal Aero Club Aviator's Certificate No. 105 at Brooklands in July 1911, he transferred to No. 1 Company Air Battalion Royal Engineers which specialised in flying airships and was renamed No. 1 Squadron of the Royal Flying Corps in May of the following year. In July 1914, he was seconded to the Royal Naval Air Service as an airship instructor. Following the outbreak of war, on 1 September Hetherington was appointed to No.3 Wing RNAS in Dunkirk as Transport Officer. The wing was commanded by the unconventional and aggressive Charles Rumney Samson, who had built from scratch a fleet of armoured cars which he used to harry the cavalry patrols of the German Army which was advancing into Belgium. Following the arrival of purpose-built armoured vehicles from the Admiralty, on 2 October Hetherington was given command of a section of five Wolseley armoured cars, representing one third of Samson's RNAS Armoured Car Section.

== Landship Committee ==
By December 1914, Hetherington had moved to Wormwood Scrubs Naval Air Station in London, as Divisional Transport Officer for the armoured car formation which was being assembled there. One of his engineer officers, Robert Francis Macfie, had been investigating the use of Holt tractors which ran on continuous tracks. When Macfie suggested that they be used to cross trenches on the battlefield, Hetherington joked that it would be better to "take a thing like the gasometer at the Oval, put on a couple of wheels like the Earl's Court Wheel, put your mechanism inside and put in some decent guns like 12-inch naval guns, then you can cross the Rhine".

Although initially suggested in jest, Hetherington began work on a detailed design aided by his subordinates, which he submitted to his commanding officer, Murray Sueter, and became known as the "Hetherington Proposal". The three huge wheels were intended to be driven by electric motors using the power generated by submarine-type diesel engines. Including the 12-inch gun armament which weighed 47 tons, the total weight was calculated at 800 tons. Sueter persuaded Hetherington that this would be impossibly large, so a second design was produced, the "Revised Hetherington Proposal", this time of 300 tons, with three 40 foot diameter wheels and an armament of three twin turrets for 4-inch guns. At the end of January 1915, Sueter forwarded this design to Winston Churchill, the First Lord of the Admiralty who was desperate to find a way to overcome the static trench warfare which had developed, despite the fact that this was not really naval business. Churchill forwarded the plan to Jackie Fisher, the first Sea Lord, who passed it on to his gunnery expert, Percy Scott, whose opinion was that it would be too easily targeted by enemy artillery before it could be used.

However, that was not the end of the line for the Revised Hetherington Proposal, because in early February, Hetherington attended a dinner at Murray's Cabaret Club in Soho hosted by the Duke of Westminster, who had aggressively commanded an armoured car section in Samson's Dunkirk wing. Also present were Albert Gerald Stern, a former banker and one of Hetherington's officers, and James Radley, the racing driver. The duke was enthused by Hetherington's account of his machine and invited Churchill to a dinner party on 17 February where Hetherington was able to explain his proposal in detail. As a direct result, Churchill established the Landship Committee, which was chaired by Eustace d'Eyncourt, the Director of Naval Construction, Stern was the secretary and Hetherington was joined by Colonel Wilfred Dumble of the Royal Naval Division who had previously managed the London General Omnibus Company. Although Hetherington's proposal was quickly found to be impracticable, William Tritton did construct a much smaller machine on the "Big Wheel" principle for the committee, but after numerous problems, it was abandoned on 8 June. The committee also followed several other lines of inquiry. This included a trip to Paris by Hetherington in April to investigate a new type of gel-filled laminate armour which proved to be useless. On 30 June 1915, Hetherington himself drove a Killen-Strait tracked vehicle across broken ground and barbed wire in a demonstration at Wormwood Scrubs, attended by Churchill and David Lloyd George, the new Minister of Munitions. Although the Killen-Strait tractor was too small to be useful, the trial would lead to the adoption of tracked propulsion for Little Willie, the first prototype tank. In January 1916, Hetherington was given command of a detachment from No. 20 Squadron, Royal Naval Armoured Car Division, that provided the crew for "Mother", the prototype of the Mark I tank, when it was demonstrated to senior naval and military officers and government officials at Hatfield Park in Hertfordshire.

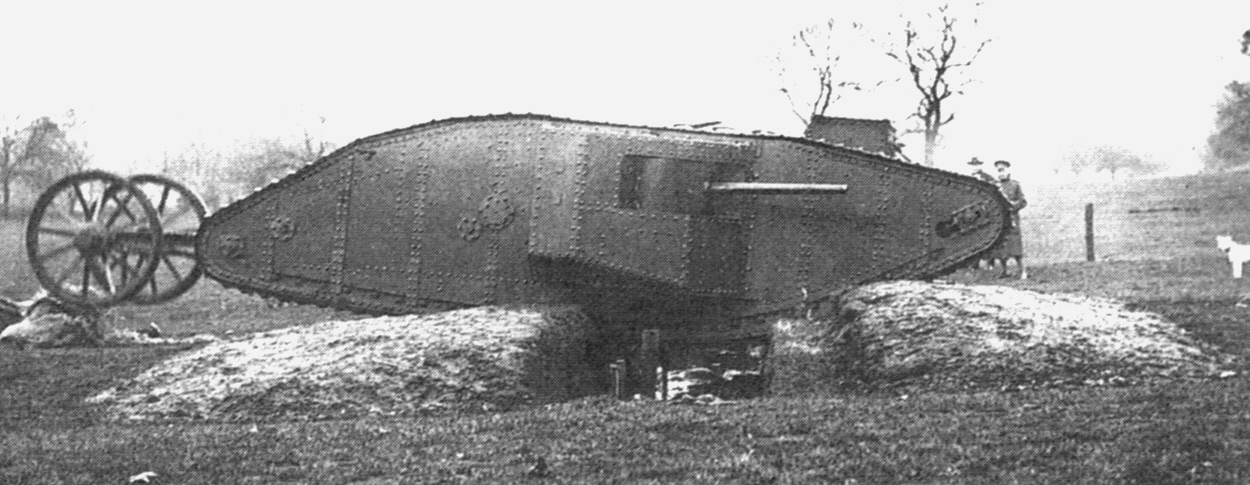
"Mother", the prototype Mark I tank, being demonstrated at Hatfield Park in January 1916; Hetherington commanded the crew.

In January 1918, Major Hetherington was created a Commander of the Order of the British Empire for "services in connection with the origination of the Tanks". In November 1919, the Royal Commission on Awards to Inventors concluded that "great credit" was due to Major Hetherington for his part in the development of the tank, but no monetary reward was due because his work had been within the scope of his duty.

=== Revised Hetherington Proposal Specifications ===
- Armament: 3 twin 4-inch gun turrets with 300 rounds per gun
- Horse power: 800 h.p. Sunbeam Diesel engine with fuel for 24 hours
- Total weight: 300 tons
- Armour: 3 inches
- Diameter of wheels: 40 feet
- Tread of main wheels: 13 feet 4 inches
- Tread of steering wheel: 5 feet
- Overall length: 100 feet
- Overall width: 80 feet
- Overall height: 46 feet
- Clearance: 17 feet
- Top speed on good going: 8 miles per hour
- Top speed on bad going: 4 miles per hour

== Later career ==
Transferring to the Royal Air Force, Hetherington had reached the rank of wing commander when he was sent to Washington, D.C., as the British air attaché in 1930, and to Rome in 1931 with the rank of group captain before retiring in 1935. He finally relinquished his commission as a reserve officer in 1943.

In 1921, he married Clementine Dundas Bartolucci and they had one daughter, Candida. Hetherington died on 14 October 1951.
