= Vickers machine gun =

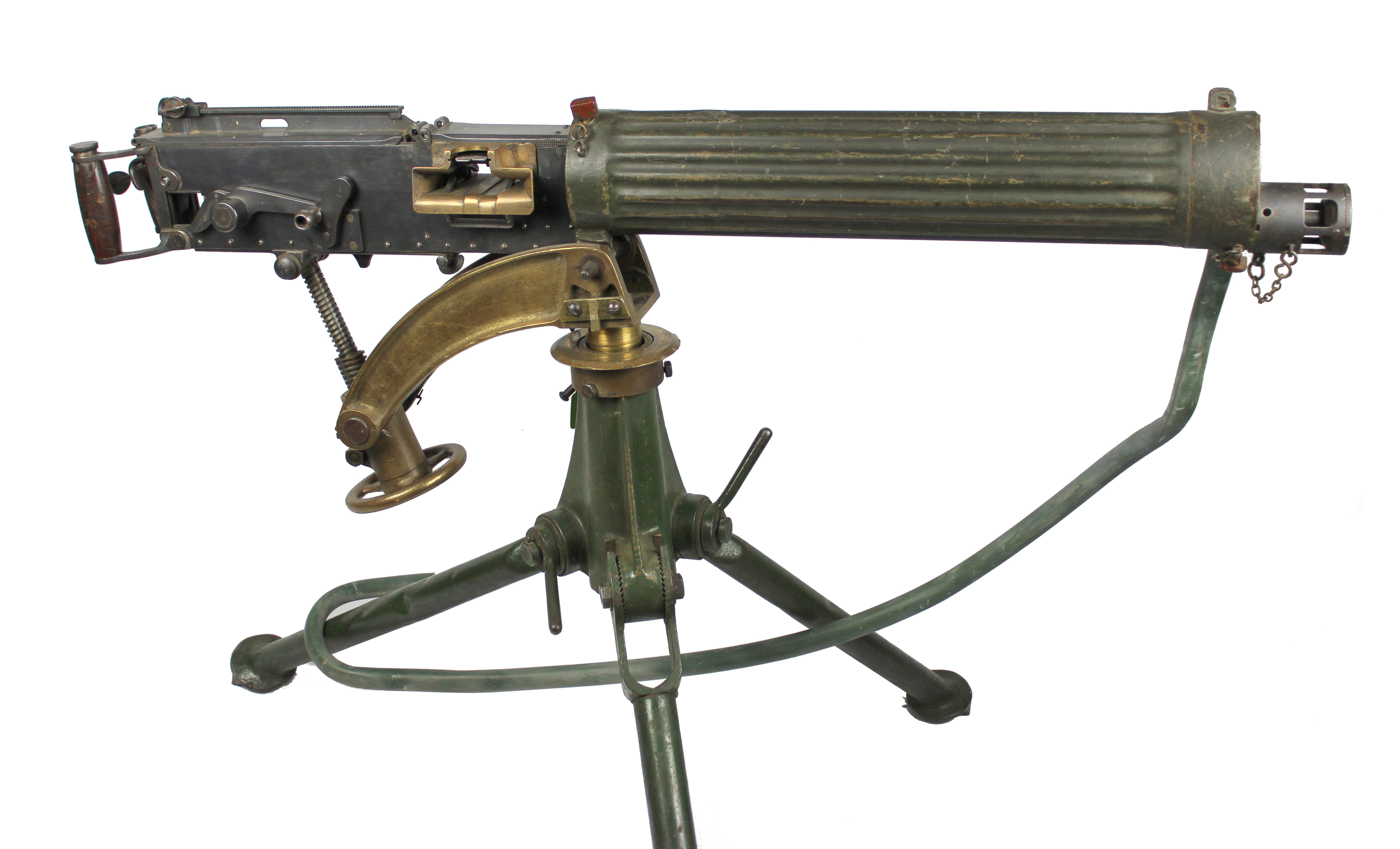
- A Vickers machine gun mounted on a tripod. This example is at York Castle Museum.
- Type: Heavy machine gun
- Place of origin: United Kingdom

Service history
- In service: 1912–1968
- Used by: See § Users
- Wars: See § Conflicts

Production history
- Designed: 1912
- Manufacturer: Vickers
- Unit cost: £175 in 1914; £80 in 1918; ~£50 in 1926

Specifications
- Mass: 33–51 lb (15–23 kg) all-up
- Length: 3 ft 8 in (1,120 mm)
- Barrel length: 28 in (710 mm)
- Crew: 3
- Cartridge: .303 British; For other cartridges, see § Foreign service
- Action: Recoil with gas boost
- Rate of fire: 450–500 rounds/min
- Muzzle velocity: 2,440 ft/s (744 m/s) (.303 Mk. VII ball); 2,525 ft/s (770 m/s) (.303 Mk. VIIIz ball)
- Effective firing range: 2,187 yd (2,000 m)
- Maximum firing range: 4,500 yd (4,115 m) indirect fire (.303 Mk. VIIIz ball)
- Feed system: 250-round canvas belt

The Vickers machine gun or Vickers gun is a water-cooled .303 British (7.7 mm) machine gun produced by Vickers Limited, originally for the British Army. The gun was operated by a three-man crew, but typically required more men to move and operate it: one fired, one fed the ammunition, the others helped to carry the weapon, its ammunition, and spare parts. It was in service from before the First World War until the 1960s, with air-cooled versions of it on many Allied World War I fighter aircraft.

The weapon had a reputation for great solidity and reliability. Ian V. Hogg, in Weapons & War Machines, describes an action that took place in August 1916, during which the British 100th Company of the Machine Gun Corps fired their ten Vickers guns to deliver sustained fire for twelve hours. Using 100 barrels, they fired a million rounds without breakdowns. "It was this absolute foolproof reliability which endeared the Vickers to every British soldier who ever fired one. It never broke down; it just kept on firing and came back for more."

== History ==
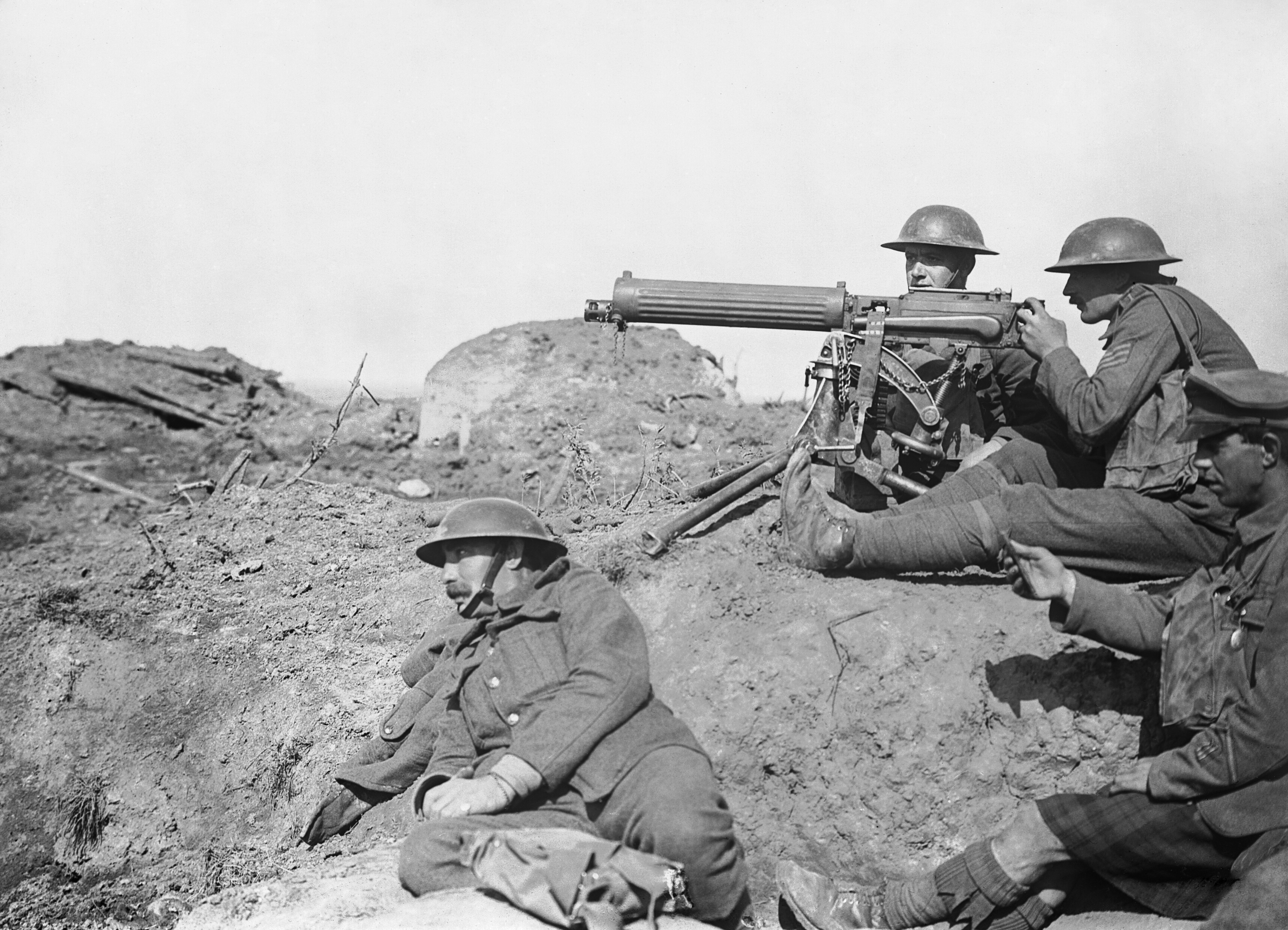
A Vickers machine gun crew in action at the Battle of the Menin Road Ridge, September 1917

The Vickers machine gun was based on the successful Maxim gun of the late 19th century. After purchasing the Maxim company outright in 1896, Vickers took the design of the Maxim gun and improved it, inverting the mechanism as well as reducing its weight by lightening and simplifying the action and using high strength alloys for certain components. A muzzle booster was also added.

The British Army formally adopted the Vickers gun as its standard machine gun under the name Gun, Machine, Mark I, Vickers, .303-inch on 26 November 1912. There were shortages when the First World War began, and the British Expeditionary Force was still equipped with Maxims when sent to France in 1914. Vickers was threatened with prosecution for war profiteering due to the exorbitant price demanded for each gun. As a result, the price was much reduced. As the war progressed, and production numbers increased, it became the British Army's primary machine gun, and was used on all fronts during the conflict.

Vickers machine gun production during WWI
1914 (Aug.–Dec.)	1915	1916	1917	1918	Total
266	2,405	7,429	21,782	39,473	71,355

When the Lewis Gun was adopted as a light machine gun and issued to infantry units, the Vickers guns were redefined as heavy machine guns, withdrawn from infantry units, and grouped in the hands of the new Machine Gun Corps. When heavier 0.5 in (12.7 mm) calibre machine guns appeared, the tripod-mounted, rifle-calibre machine guns such as the Vickers were further re-classified as "medium machine guns". After the First World War, the Machine Gun Corps (MGC) was disbanded and the Vickers returned to infantry units.

Before the Second World War, there were plans to replace the Vickers gun as part of a widescale change from rimmed to rimless rounds; one of the contenders was the 7.92mm Besa machine gun (British-built Czech ZB-53 design), which eventually became the British Army's standard tank-mounted machine gun. However, the Vickers remained in service with the British Army until 30 March 1968. Its last operational use was in the Radfan during the Aden Emergency. Its successor in UK service is the British L7 variant of the FN MAG general purpose machine gun.

=== Use in aircraft ===
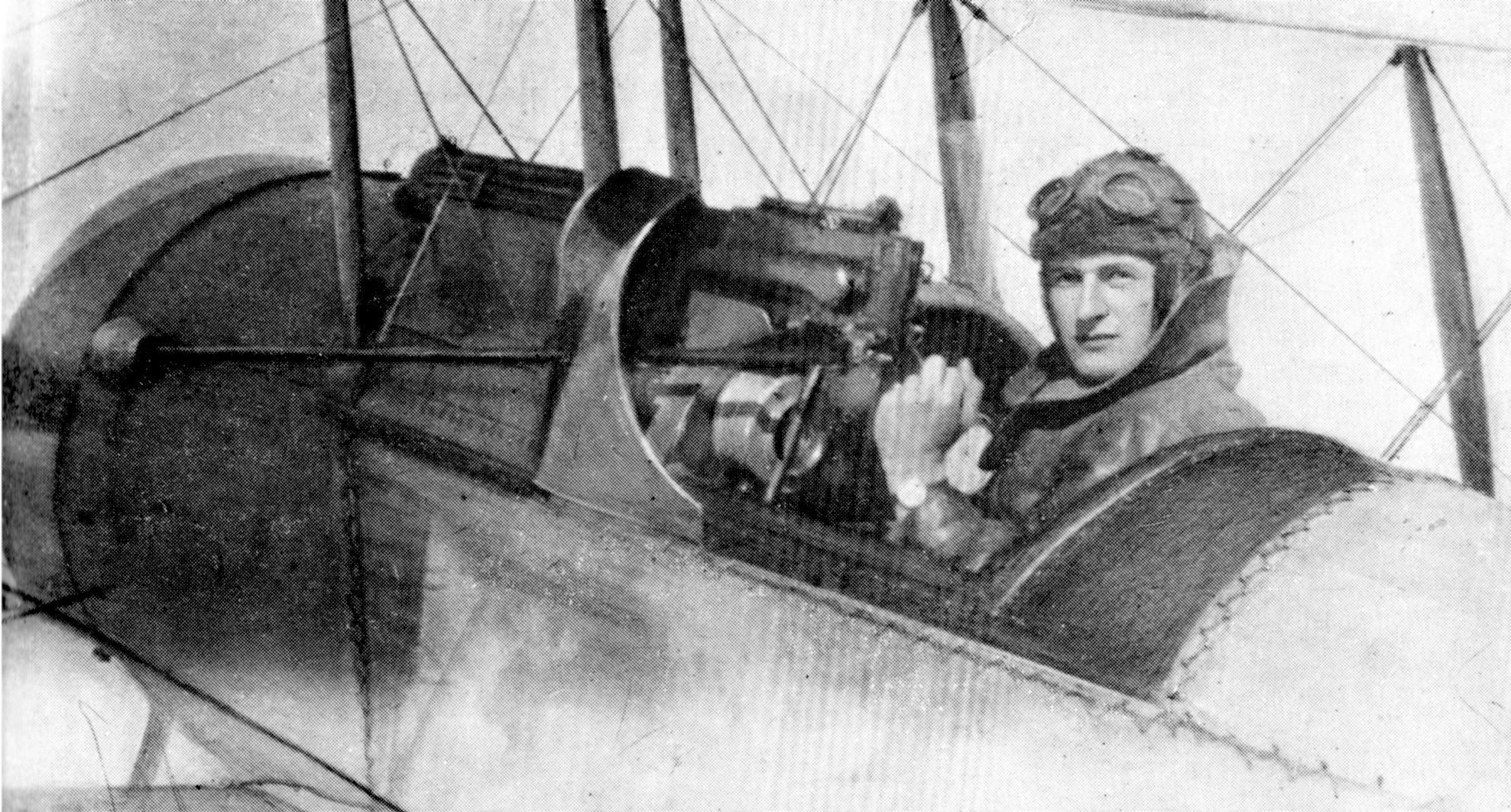
The cockpit of a Bristol Scout biplane in 1916, showing a Vickers machine gun synchronised to fire through the propeller by an early Vickers-Challenger interrupter gear.

In 1913, a Vickers machine gun was mounted on the experimental Vickers E.F.B.1 biplane, which was probably the world's first purpose-built combat aeroplane. However, by the time the production version, the Vickers F.B.5, had entered service the following year, the armament had been changed to a Lewis gun.

During World War I, the Vickers gun became a standard weapon on British and French military aircraft, especially after 1916, initially in a single gun configuration (Nieuport 17, SPAD VII, Sopwith Triplane), increased to a twin-gun standard in later war fighters (Nieuport 28, SPAD XIII, Sopwith Camel), with exceptions such as the S.E.5, which had a single synchronized Vickers and a Lewis gun mounted above the upper wing. Although heavier than the Lewis, its closed bolt firing cycle made it much easier to synchronise to allow it to fire through aircraft propellers. The belt feed was enclosed right up to the gun's feed-way to inhibit the effect of wind. Steel disintegrating-link ammunition belts were perfected in the UK by William de Courcy Prideaux in mid-war and became standard for aircraft guns thereafter. From 1917 to 1919, French Manufacture d'armes de Châtellerault produced under license .303 Vickers machine guns (240 were delivered before the Armistice) but most of the French aircraft Vickers machine guns were British-made.

By 1917 it had been determined that standard rifle calibre cartridges were less satisfactory for shooting down observation balloons than larger calibres carrying incendiary or tracer bullets; the Vickers machine gun was chambered in the 11mm Vickers round, known as the Vickers aircraft machine gun and sometimes the "Balloon Buster", and was adopted by the Allies as a standard anti-balloon armament, used by both the British and French in this role until the end of the war.

The famous Sopwith Camel and the SPAD XIII types used twin synchronized Vickers, as did most British and French fighters between 1918 and the mid-1930s. In the air, the weighty water-cooling system was rendered redundant by low temperatures at high altitude and the constant stream of air passing over the gun (and lack of any need for sustained fire such as employed by ground troops); but because the weapon relied on boosted barrel recoil, the (empty) water-holding barrel jacket or casing was retained. Several sets of louvered slots were cut into the barrel jacket to aid air cooling, a better solution than that which had initially been attempted with the 1915-vintage lMG 08 German aircraft ordnance.

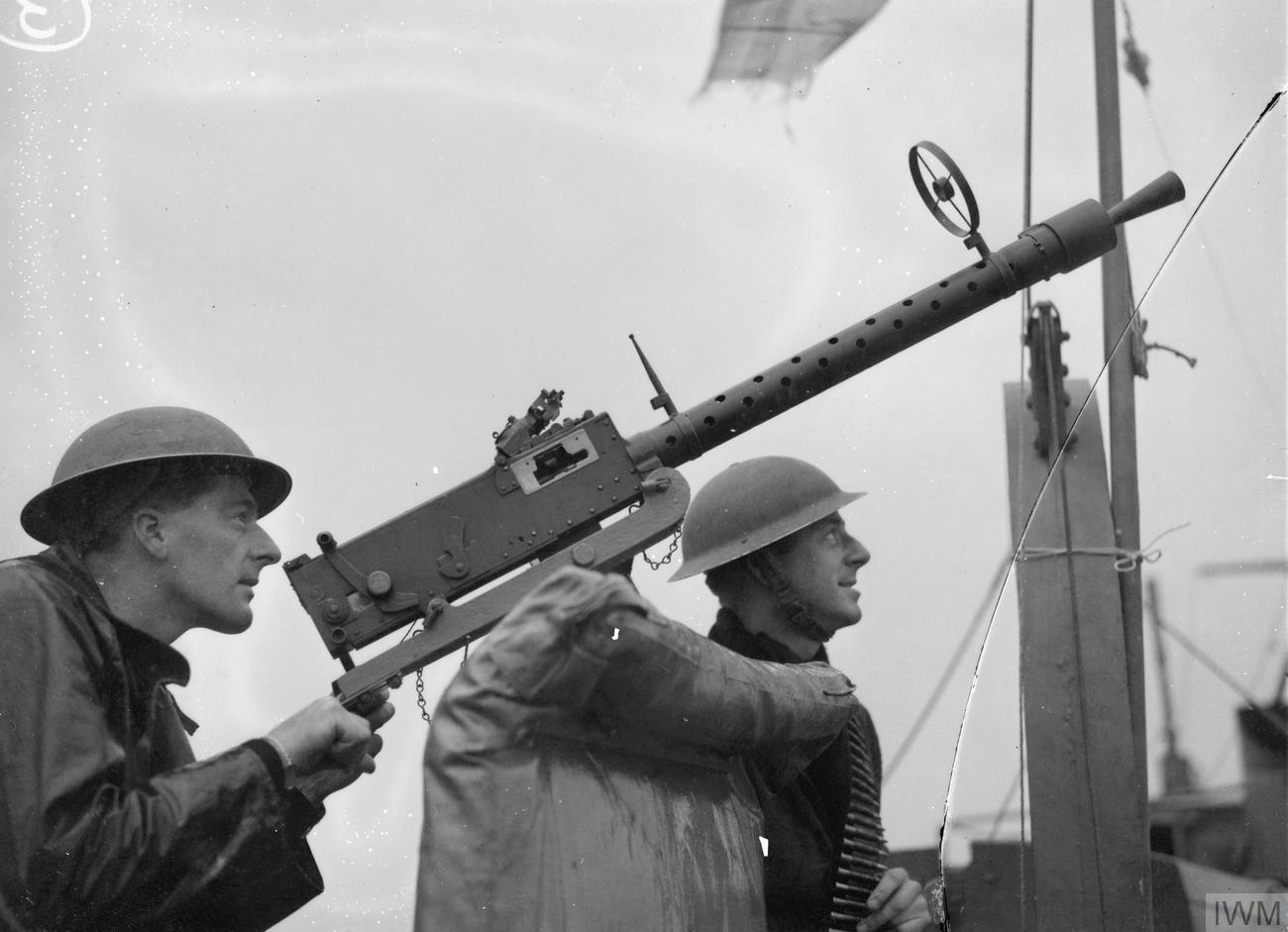
Vickers Mk. II* or III in naval anti-aircraft service during WWII in the Mediterranean

In 1918 the slotted modified original barrel jacket was replaced with a slimmer jacket on the Mk. II version, and in 1927 a muzzle flash suppressor was added on the Mk. II*.

As the machine gun armament of US and UK fighter aircraft moved from the fuselage to the wings in the years before World War II, the Vickers was generally replaced by the faster-firing and more reliable Browning Model 1919 using metal-linked cartridges. The Gloster Gladiator was the last RAF fighter to be armed with the Vickers, later replaced by Brownings. The Fairey Swordfish was fitted with the weapon until production ended in August 1944.

Several British bombers and attack aircraft of the Second World War mounted the Vickers K machine gun or VGO, a completely different design, more closely resembling the Lewis gun in external appearance.

Vickers machine guns, designated as models E (pilot's) and F (observer's, fed from a pan magazine) were also used among others in Poland, where 777 of them were converted to 7.92×57mm Mauser cartridge in 1933–1937.

=== Use in armored vehicles ===
The water-cooled Vickers Mark VI, Mark VI* and Mark VII were versions of the Mark I for use in tanks. They were introduced in 1936 and declared obsolete in 1944 (though they and the vehicles they were installed in were still in reserve use until the 1960s). They could be installed with either a left-hand or right-hand feed block. The Mark VI and VI* Tank Patterns were conversions of old stock Mark Is while the Mark VII Tank Pattern was new production.

=== Variants ===
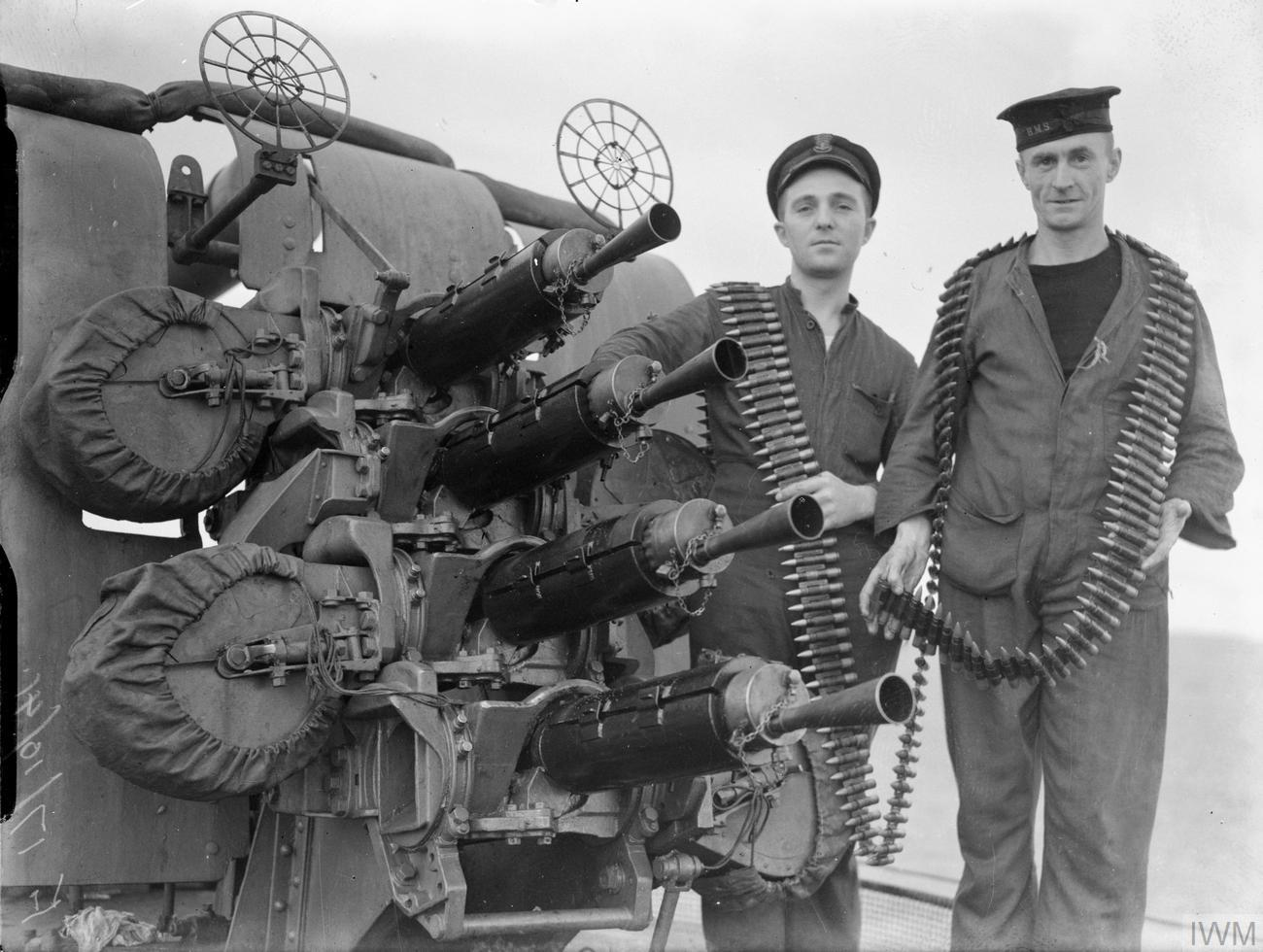
A .5-inch Mk. III, four-gun anti-aircraft mount and its crew on the cruiser HMS London in 1941

The larger calibre (half-inch) version of the Vickers was used on armoured fighting vehicles and naval vessels. The Gun, Machine, Vickers, .5-inch, Mk. II was used in tanks, the earlier Mark I having been the development model. This entered service in 1933 and was obsolete in 1944. Firing either single shot or automatic, it had a pistol type trigger grip rather than the spades of the 0.303-inch (7.7 mm) weapon.

The Gun, Machine, Vickers, .5-inch, Mk. III was used as an anti-aircraft gun on British ships. This variation was typically four guns mounted on a 360° rotating and (+80° to −10°) elevating housing. The belts were rolled into a spiral and placed in hoppers beside each gun. The heavy plain bullet weighed 1.3 oz (37 g) and was effective for the 1,500 yd (1,400 m) range. The maximum rate of fire for the Mark III was about 700 rpm from a 200-round belt carried in a drum. They were fitted from the 1920s onwards, but in practical terms, they proved of little use. During the Second World War, the naval 0.5-inch (12.7 mm) version was also mounted on power-operated turrets in smaller watercraft, such as Motor Gun Boats and Motor Torpedo Boats.

The Mark IV and V guns were improvements on the Mark II. Intended for British light tanks, some were used during the war on mounts on trucks by the Long Range Desert Group in the North Africa Campaign.

=== Foreign service ===
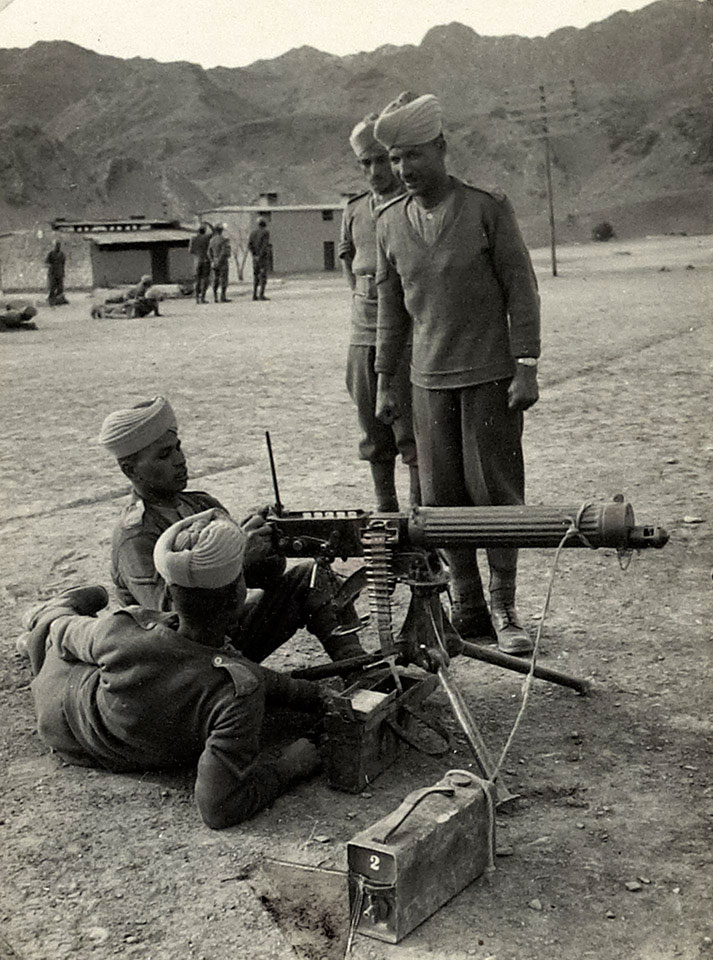
A British Indian Army Vickers machine gun crew in the North West Frontier, British India, 1940.

The Vickers was widely sold commercially, and saw service with many nations with their own ammunition. It was modified for each country and served as a base for many other weapons. For example:

- 6.5×50mmSR Arisaka
- 6.5×52mm Carcano
- 6.5×53.5mmR (.256 Mannlicher)
- 7×57mm Mauser
- 7.5×55mm Swiss
- 7.62×51mm NATO
- 7.62×54mmR
- 7.62×63mm (.30-06 Springfield)
- 7.65×53mm Argentine — In very small numbers with Argentina and Belgium.
- 7.7×58mm Arisaka — Licensed as the Type 89 "fixed type" machine gun
- 8×50mmR Lebel — 2,000 ordered by France in 1914, but only 52 delivered.

==== Service after World War II ====
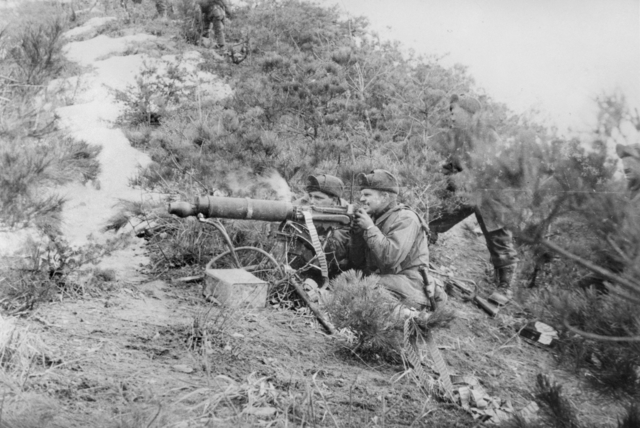
Australian soldiers of the 3rd Battalion, Royal Australian Regiment operate a Vickers gun during fighting near Chipyong-ni during the Korean War, February 1951

The Union of South Africa retained a large inventory of surplus Vickers machine guns after World War II. Many of these were donated to the National Liberation Front of Angola (FNLA) and National Union for the Total Independence of Angola (UNITA) during the Angolan Civil War. Angolan militants were usually trained in their use by South African advisers. Small quantities re-chambered for 7.62 mm NATO ammunition remained in active service with the South African Defence Force until the mid-1980s, when they were all relegated to reserve storage. Six were withdrawn from storage and used by a South African liaison team operating with UNITA during the Battle of Cuito Cuanavale, after which the weapons were finally retired.

In the mid-1960s, the Vickers machine gun remained in service in countries such as India, Israel and Egypt. It saw action with the Ceylon Army in the 1971 JVP insurrection.

In the 2022 Russian invasion of Ukraine the Vickers machine gun has repeatedly been used by the Ukrainian National Guard to destroy Russian HESA Shahed 136 drones.

==== Colt–Vickers M1915 ====
The Board of Ordnance & Fortifications held a meeting on March 15, 1913 to consider the adoption of a new type of machine gun. ... The Board is of the opinion that, with the exception of the Vickers gun, none of the other guns submitted showed sufficiently marked superiority for the military service, in comparison with the service [Benét–Mercié] Automatic Machine Rifle to warrant further consideration of them in the field test. The Board is of the unanimous opinion that the Vickers rifle caliber gun, light model, stood the most satisfactory test. As to the merits of the Vickers gun there is no question—it stood in a class by itself. Not a single part was broken nor replaced. Nor was there a jam worthy of the name during the entire series of tests. A better performance could not be desired.

— Captain John S. Butler, Office of the Chief of Ordnance

By the early 1900s, the U.S. military had a mixed collection of automatic machine guns in use that included M1895 "potato diggers", 287 M1904 Maxims, 670 M1909 Benét–Mercié guns, and 353 Lewis machine guns. In 1913, the U.S. began to search for a superior automatic weapon. One of the weapons considered was the British Vickers machine gun.

Field tests were conducted of the Vickers in 1914, and the gun was unanimously approved by the board for the army under the designation "Vickers Machine Gun Model of 1915, Caliber .30, Water-Cooled". One hundred twenty-five guns were ordered from Colt's Manufacturing Company in 1915, with an additional 4,000 ordered the next year, all chambered for .30-06. Design complexities, design modifications, and focus on producing previously ordered weapons meant that when the U.S. entered World War I in April 1917, Colt had not manufactured a single M1915.

Production began in late 1917 with shipments to the Western Front in mid-1918. The first twelve divisions to reach France were given French Hotchkiss M1914 machine guns, and the next ten had M1915s. The next twelve divisions were to have Browning M1917 machine guns, but there was a shortage of parts. By August 1918, thirteen U.S. divisions were armed with the Colt–Vickers machine gun, and many aircraft were armed with the weapons as well (2,888 guns were converted). 7,653 guns were issued during the war out of 12,125 produced in total. War damage losses reduced the number of M1915s in the U.S. Army inventory from 9200+ to about 8,000 total.

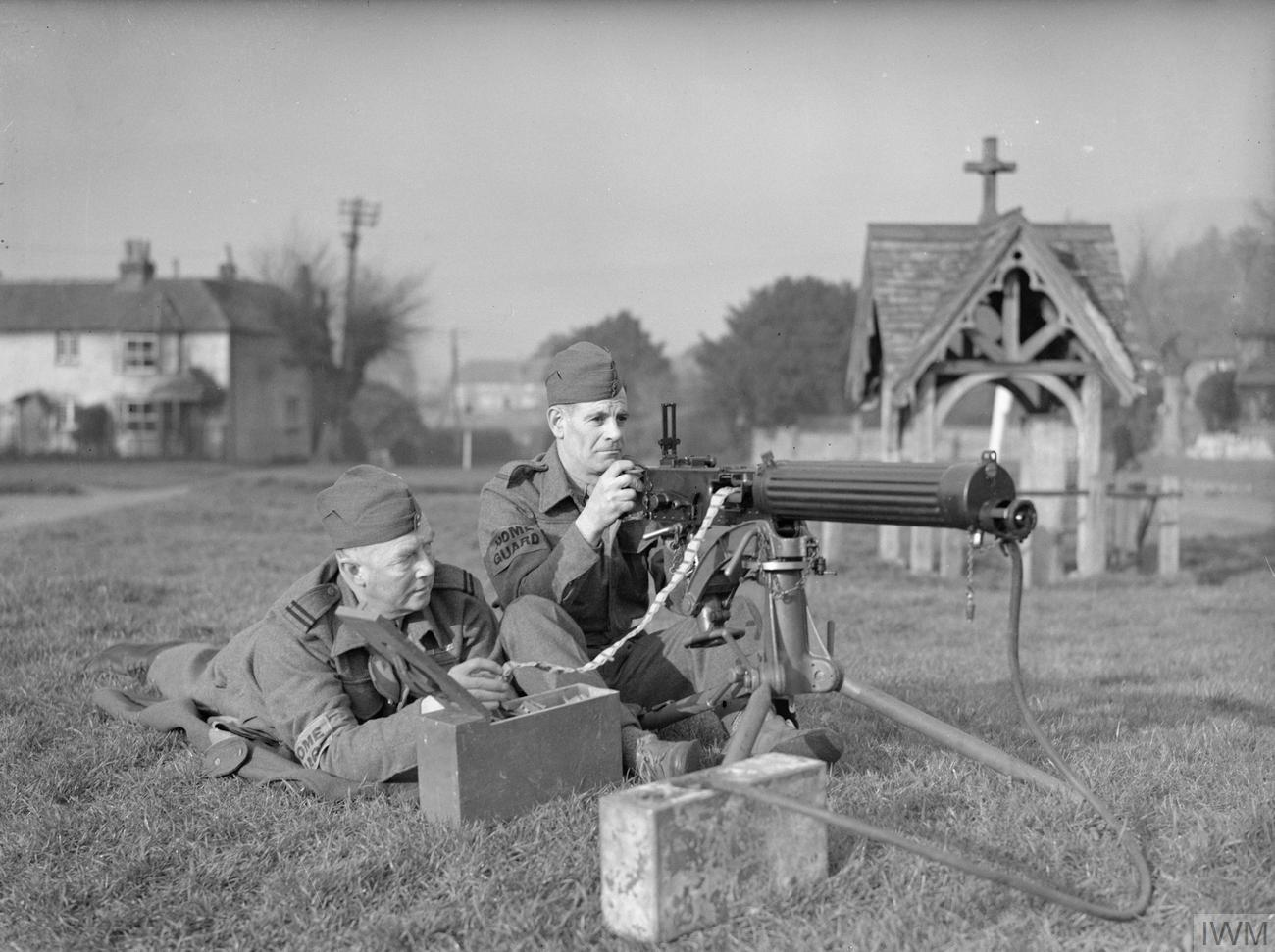
In service with the Home Guard

After World War I, the Colt–Vickers machine guns were kept in reserve until World War II. Several hundred were sent to the Dutch East Indies and the Philippines, and were all eventually lost to enemy action. In 1940 and 1941, a total of 7,071 M1915 guns were purchased by the United Kingdom to re-equip their forces after the Dunkirk evacuation, which depleted the weapon from the U.S. inventory before their entry into the war. Because the M1915 Colt–Vickers was not chambered for the standard British .303, it was painted with a red band to differentiate it and restricted it to Home Guard use.

== Specifications ==
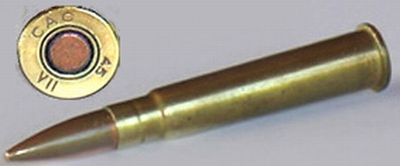
Rimmed, centrefire Mk 7 .303 inch cartridge from World War II. The type of ammunition is denoted by the colour of the annulus, the narrow ring shown here surrounding the percussion cap

The weight of the gun itself varied based on the gear attached, but was generally 25 to 30 pounds (11 to 14 kg) and the tripod weighed a further 40 to 50 lb (18 to 23 kg). The ammunition boxes for the 250-round ammunition belts weighed 22 pounds (10.0 kg) each. In addition, it required about 7.5 imperial pints (4.3 L) of water in its evaporative cooling system to prevent overheating. The heat of the barrel boiled the water in the jacket surrounding it. The resulting steam was taken off by a flexible tube to a condenser container—this had the dual benefits of avoiding giving away the gun's location, and also enabling re-use of the water, which was very important in arid environments.

In British service, the Vickers gun fired the standard .303 inch cartridge used in the Lee–Enfield rifle, which generally had to be hand-loaded into the cloth ammunition belts. There was also a 0.5-inch (12.7 mm) calibre version used as an anti-aircraft weapon and various other calibres produced for foreign buyers.

The gun was 3 feet 8 inches (112 cm) long and its cyclic rate of fire was between 450 and 600 rounds per minute. In practice, it was expected that 10,000 rounds would be fired per hour, and that the barrel would be changed every hour—a two-minute job for a trained team. The Vickers gun could sustain fire for long durations of time exceeding the recommended 10,000 rounds an hour due to the water-cooled barrel and hourly barrel swaps. One account states that a Vickers fired just under 5 million rounds in a week as a test in 1963 at Strensall Barracks and was still operable. The muzzle velocity was 2,440 ft/s (744 m/s) ±40 ft/s (12 m/s) with Mark VII(z) ammunition and 2,525 ft/s (770 m/s) with Mark VIIIz ammunition. The Mark VIIIz cartridge, which had a boat-tailed spitzer 'streamlined' bullet, could be used against targets at a range of approximately 4,500 yd (4,115 m). The bullet jackets were generally made of an alloy of cupro-nickel, and gilding metal. Ammunition for the Vickers used colour-coded annuli. Tracer ammunition was marked with a red annulus; armouring-piercing ammunition with a green annulus, and incendiary ammunition with a blue annulus. Explosive ammunition was originally marked with an orange annulus before the Second World War, but was changed to black.

== Use ==
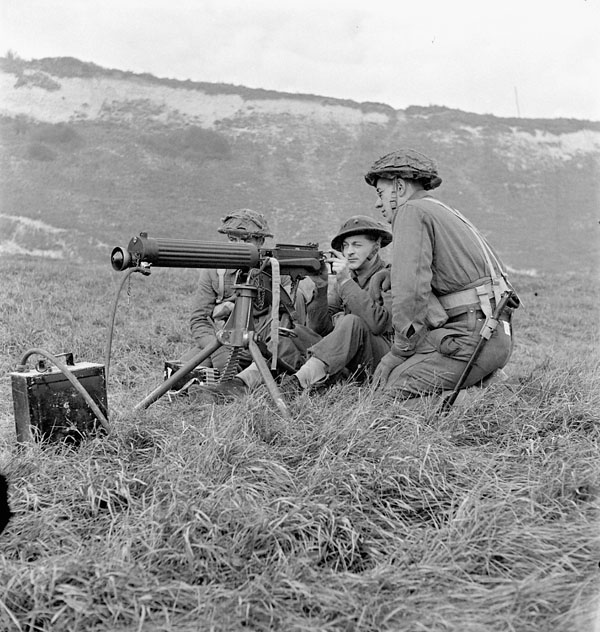
Soldiers of Princess Patricia's Canadian Light Infantry firing a Vickers machine gun during a training exercise, Eastbourne, England, 3 December 1942

The gun and its tripod were carried separately and both were heavy. The Vickers Mk I was 30 lb (13.6 kg) without the water and tripod, and weighed 40 lb (18.1 kg) with the water. The original design did not anticipate it being carried in difficult terrain on men's backs, but the weapon was so popular that soldiers were generally content to carry it to all manner of difficult locations. The tripod would be set up to make a firm base, often slightly dug into the ground and with the feet weighted down with sandbags.

The water jacket would be filled with about 4 litres (1.1 US gal) of water from a small hole at the rear end, sealed by a cap. The evaporative cooling system, though heavy, was very effective and enabled the gun to keep firing far longer than its air-cooled rival weapons. If water was unavailable, soldiers were known to resort to using their urine. It was sometimes claimed that crews would fire off a few rounds simply to heat their gun's cooling water to make tea, despite the resulting brew tasting of machine-oil. In extremely cold weather, the cooling water could freeze and damage the gun. This problem was addressed using an insulating water jacket cover, introduced in 1918 but still in use during the Korean War. To further combat freezing, some crews added vehicle antifreeze, drained the water jacket, or simply fired a few rounds periodically.

The loader would sit to the gunner's right, and would feed in cloth ammunition belts. The weapon would draw in the belt from right to left, pull the next round out of the belt and into the chamber, fire it, then send the fired brass cartridge down and out of the receiver while the cloth belt would continue out the left side. During sustained fire, the barrel would heat up which heated the water in the jacket until hot enough for the water to evaporate or boil thereby cooling the barrel releasing the heat through steam. It took the Mk I approximately 600 rounds of continuous fire to boil the water in the jacket, evaporating at a rate of 1.5 imperial pints (850 ml) per 1,000 rounds. The steam would reach the top of the jacket and enter a steam tube which led to a port that placed under the jacket near the muzzle. A hose was connected to the jacket which released the steam into a metal water can, allowing it to be vented away from the rest of the gun, avoiding the steam cloud showing the gun's position. This also allowed any condensate to be reclaimed from the steam. Before the can got too full, it would be emptied back into the jacket to replenish the water which would have fallen as the water evaporated and boiled away. If the water jacket needed to be emptied, a plug under the jacket could be unscrewed.

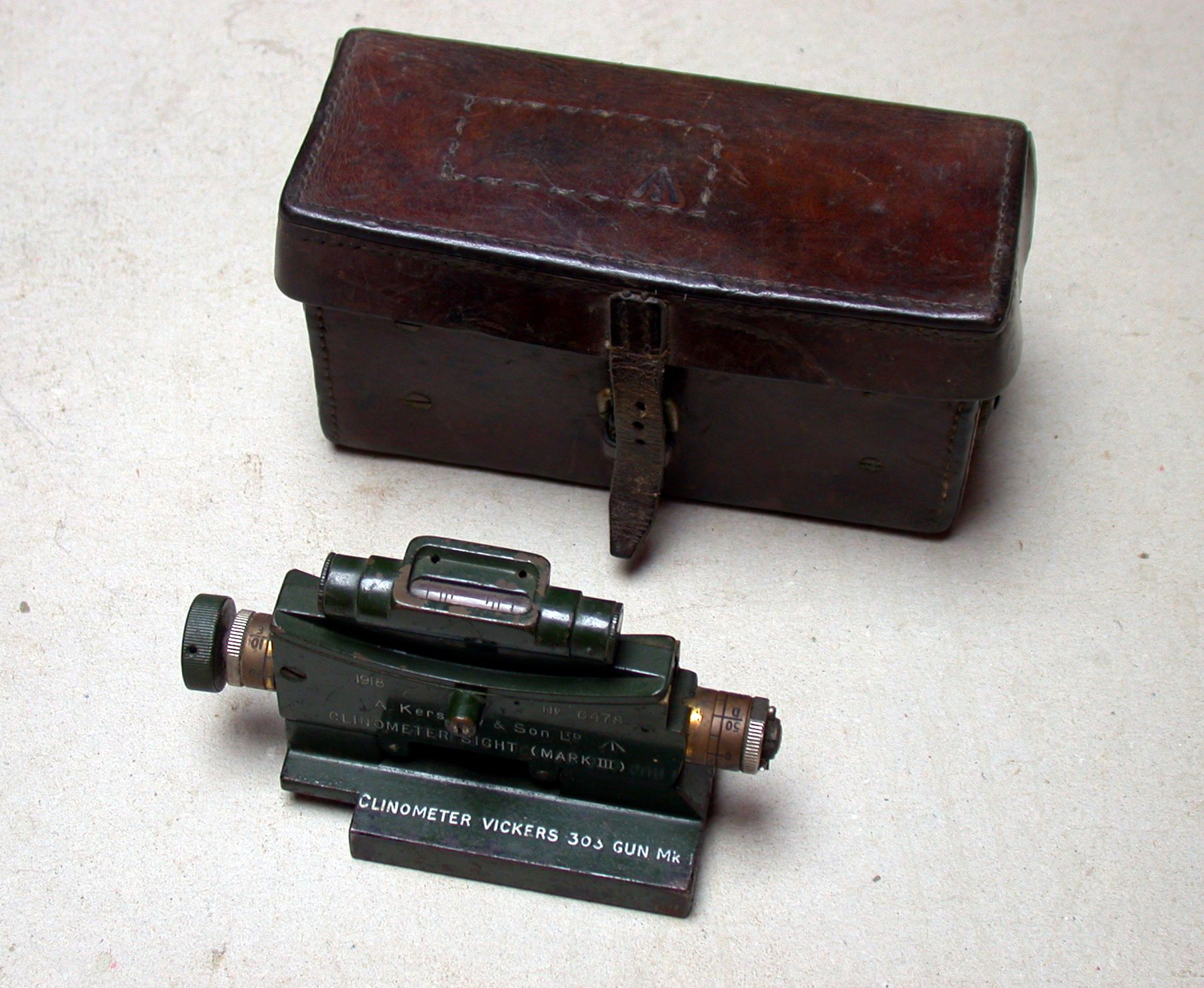
Clinometer for Vickers .303 machine gun

The Vickers was used for indirect fire against enemy positions at ranges up to 4,500 yards (4,115 m) with Mark VIIIz ammunition. This plunging fire was used to great effect against road junctions, trench systems, forming up points, and other locations that might be observed by a forward observer, or zeroed in at one time for future attacks, or guessed at by men using maps and experience. Sometimes a location might be zeroed in during the day, and then attacked at night, to the surprise and confusion of the enemy. New Zealand units were known to be especially fond of this tactic. A white disc would be set up on a pole near the gun, and the gunner would aim at a mark on it, knowing that this corresponded to aiming at the distant target. There was a special back-sight with a tall extension on it for this purpose. The only similar weapon of the time to use indirect fire was the German MG 08, which had a separate attachment sight with range calculator.

A British World War II Vickers medium machine gun platoon typically had one officer in command of four guns, in two sections of two, each with a crew and a small team of riflemen whose job was to protect the gun and keep it supplied with ammunition.

=== Vehicle use ===
The Vickers machine gun was used mounted in tanks and armoured cars.

==== List of vehicles using Vickers machine gun ====
- Rolls-Royce armoured car
- Female tank
- Mark I tank
- Delaunay-Belleville armoured car
- Lanchester armoured car
- Seabrook armoured lorry
- Pierce-Arrow armoured AA lorry
- Tank, Light, Mk I
- Tank, Light, Mk II
- Tank, Light, Mk III
- Tank, Light, Mk IV
- Mk VI light tank
- Vickers 6-ton
- Cruiser Mk I
- Cruiser Mk II
- Cruiser Mk III
- Cruiser Mk IV
- Sentinel tank
- Matilda I (tank)
- Vickers Medium Mark I
- Vickers Medium Mark II
- Vickers Mk. D tank
- Universal Carrier
- Standard Beaverette
- Guy armoured car
- Lanchester 6×4 armoured car
- Marmon-Herrington armoured car
- Rhino heavy armoured car
- Rover light armoured car
- Ford Mk VI armoured car
- Dodge Mark VIII armoured car

== Operating mechanism ==
Animation of the Vickers muzzle booster operation, showing the expanding gases pushing the barrel to the rear relative to the cooling jacket

The Vickers is a fully automatic belt-fed firearm which is fired from a closed bolt. When ready to fire, a round is in the chamber and the breechblock assembly and working parts are forward. It has a recoil operated, floating action with a toggle lock similar to a Luger pistol. However, unlike the Luger, the mechanism is totally contained within the receiver or body of the Vickers. When operated, the floating action, which consists of the barrel, breechblock assembly and toggle mechanism, reciprocate as a unit within the body of the gun. The mechanism is held together by recoiling plates, that connect the breech end of the barrel to the rear of the toggle mechanism. The breech is locked closed when the toggle is straight. The crank cocking handle is part of the floating action. It acts through the rear pivot of the toggle lock. Pulling the cocking handle causes the toggle to rise. This unlocks the breech and then draws the breechblock assembly rearward. While firing, the opposite end of the crank handle cams on a round lug fixed to the body. Rearward movement of the floating action tips the cocking handle and unlocks the toggle. The recoil that unlocks the toggle is gas assisted. Propellent gases leaving the muzzle are partly contained within the muzzle cap and act on the muzzle cup (attached to the barrel) to assist in propelling the floating action rearward to the point where the toggle mechanism is unlocked. The breechblock assembly then opens fully while opposed by a spring which ultimately returns it to the closed position. The spring under tension acts on a crank mounted on the opposite side of the body to the cocking handle.

The feed block assembly sits directly above the breech. It accepts the canvas belt loaded with ammunition. With each firing cycle, it advances the belt by one round so that a fresh cartridge is presented ready for loading. The belt is advanced by pawls which move from side to side. The pawls are operated by a linkage that engages with the floating action. A second set of spring-loaded pawls tilt up and down as the belt passes over them. These hold the belt during the return cycle of the feed pawls.

The breechblock assembly is roughly as high as the receiver of the gun. On its front face is the extractor block. Levers cause this to move up and down as the action is cycled. It has a slot with two grooves which allow the rim of the cartridge to be held from each side, much like a stripper clip does. With the breechblock assembly closed and ready to fire, the extractor block grips the base of two cartridges: the lower cartridge in the chamber ready to fire and an upper cartridge held in the canvas belt within the feed block. When the breechblock assembly unlocks after firing, the extractor pulls the spent cartridge from the chamber and, once clear, this falls through an ejection port in the underside of the gun's body. Unlocking the breechblock assembly also withdraws the upper round (the next round to be chambered) from the belt. When there is sufficient clearance, the extractor block lowers the new round until it is aligned with the chamber. Forward movement of the breechblock assembly then chambers the round. Near the very end of the forward cycle, the extractor block rises to engage the next round ready to be loaded.

The breechblock assembly houses the firing pin and trigger mechanism. The firing pin, under spring tension, strikes the primer of the cartridge through a hole in the extractor block. It must therefore be retracted before the extractor block moves down as part of the loading cycle. Once retracted, the firing pin is held in a cocked position by a sear, ready for the next firing cycle. As the breechblock assembly fully closes on the breech, the sear disengages but the firing pin is held rearward by the trigger. The end of the trigger protrudes from the top of the breechblock assembly.

To fire the loaded gun, the gunner depresses a paddle at the rear of the gun. Through a lever, this pulls on a sliding bar that trips the trigger to release the firing pin. The weapon then cycles to load the next cartridge for firing. If the paddle is still depressed when the breech closes, the trigger is tripped again and a further firing cycle occurs.

== Users ==
- Australia
- Bangladesh
- Belgium
- Bolivia — Used during the Chaco War.
- British Empire
  - Bermuda — Bermuda Volunteer Rifle Corps
  - British Hong Kong — Hong Kong Volunteer Defence Corps
  - British Somaliland — Somaliland Camel Corps
  - British India
  - British Malaya
  - Fiji
  - Gold Coast
  - Southern Rhodesia
- Canada
- Ceylon — Used by Ceylonese army in the 1971 JVP insurrection.
- China
- Cyprus — Possibly used during the Cypriot intercommunal violence and supplied from Greece or Turkey.
- Egypt
- Ethiopian Empire — Single Class C purchased in 1911, several more purchased in 1925 and 1933
- France — 2,000 ordered in 1914
- Finland — Vickers from various sources (chambered in 7.62×54mmR and .303 British) were acquired from 1920 and 100 were also delivered by United Kingdom during the Winter War.
- German Empire — In 1918, Schutztruppe used 17 Vickers guns captured during the South West Africa campaign.
- Greece
- India
- Indonesia
- Ireland
- Israel
- Italy — 920 Vickers chambered in 6.5×52mm Carcano ordered for infantry (designated as Vickers Mod. 1911) but only 609 delivered due to the outbreak of the war, since 1917 Italy received also Vickers MK. I* in .303 British for aircraft use (designated as Vickers cal. 7,7). In the mid '20s the Vickers cal. 7,7 were upgrated becoming the Vickers cal. 7,7 modificate.
- Jordan — Arab Legion
- Kuwait
- Latvia — Vickers Mk I and Mk II (611 and 120 by April 1936) used by pre-1940 Latvian Army and by Nazi-allied Latvian Police Battalions.
- Mexico
- Nepal
- Netherlands — More than 1,000 were purchased from the British in December 1918, designated as Vickers M.18 No.1. In 1935, 800 units were rechambered to 7.92×57mmR and designated as Vickers M.18 No.2. The East Indies colonial army variant designated as M.23 machine gun, chambered in 6.5×53mmR. Used some Australian or British-made .303 Vickers during the Indonesian National Revolution.
- New Zealand
- Pakistan — Used by Pakistan army in the Indo-Pakistani War of 1947–1948.
- Paraguay — Owned 10 units before the Chaco War, and later captured an unknown number from Bolivia
- Philippines.
- Poland — Used the aircraft version, later rechambered in 7.92×57mm Mauser.
- Portugal — Produced locally as m/917
- Romania — 200 Vickers in service.
- Russian Empire — Vickers manufactured by Colt in 7.62×54mmR.
- Sierra Leone
- South Africa
- Soviet Union — Captured from Latvia during the Soviet occupation of Latvia in 1940.
- Spanish Republic — Supplied by the Soviet Union, Bolivia, and Paraguay during the Spanish Civil War.
- Tonga
- Turkey
- United Kingdom
- United States — 12,125 Vickers were issued to the US Army in France
- Vietnam — Used by Viet Minh.
- South Yemen

== Conflicts ==
- World War I
- Irish Civil War
- Chaco War
- Spanish Civil War
- Winter War
- World War II
- Indonesian National Revolution
- Greek Civil War
- First Indochina War
- Bangladesh Liberation War
- Indo-Pakistan War of 1947
- 1948 Arab–Israeli War
- Malayan Emergency
- Korean War
- Algerian War
- Cypriot intercommunal violence
- 1971 JVP insurrection
- Congo Crisis
- Aden Emergency
- South African Border War
- Syrian civil war

== Gallery of images ==
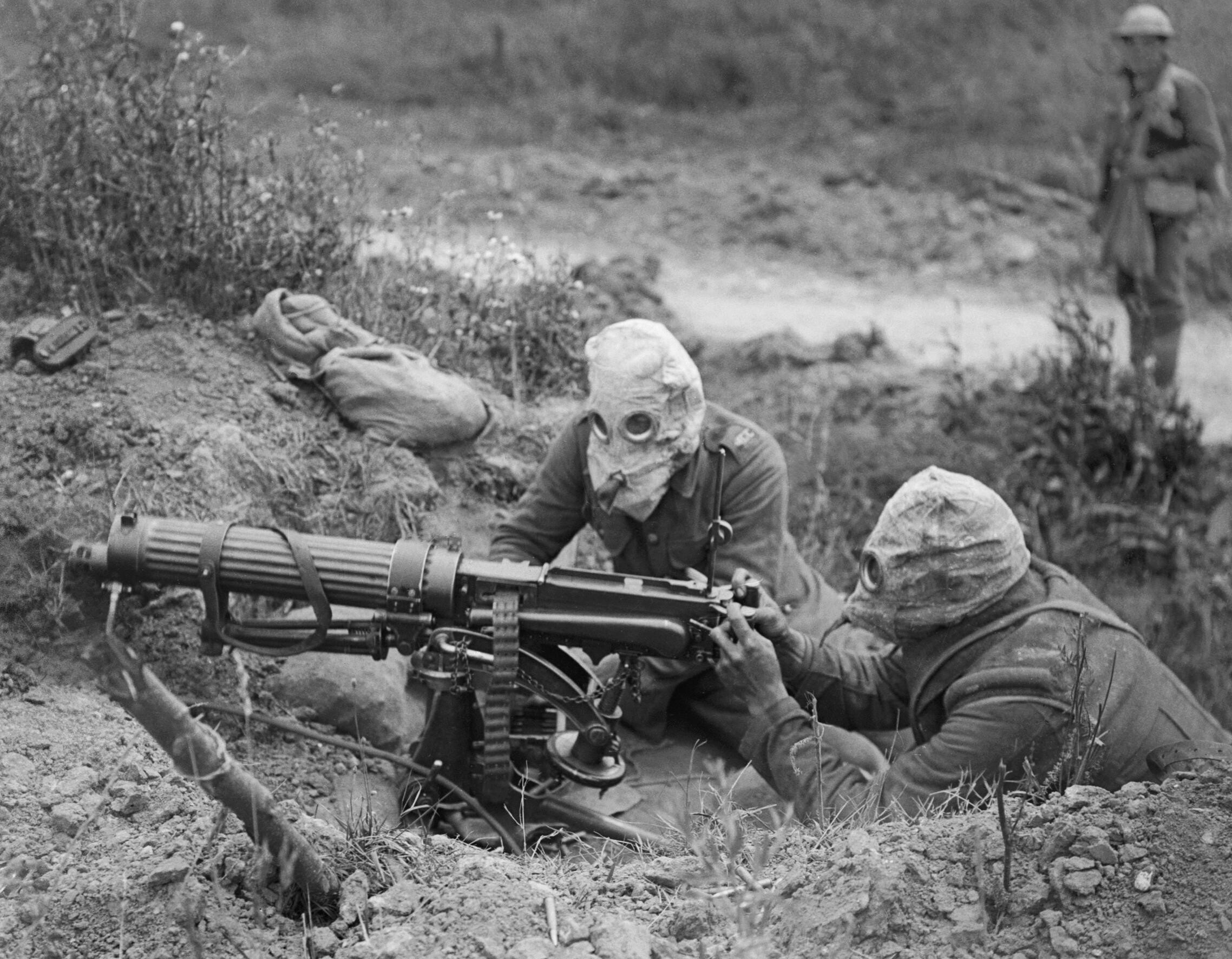
British Vickers gun team in action at the Battle of the Somme. Both are wearing gas masks.

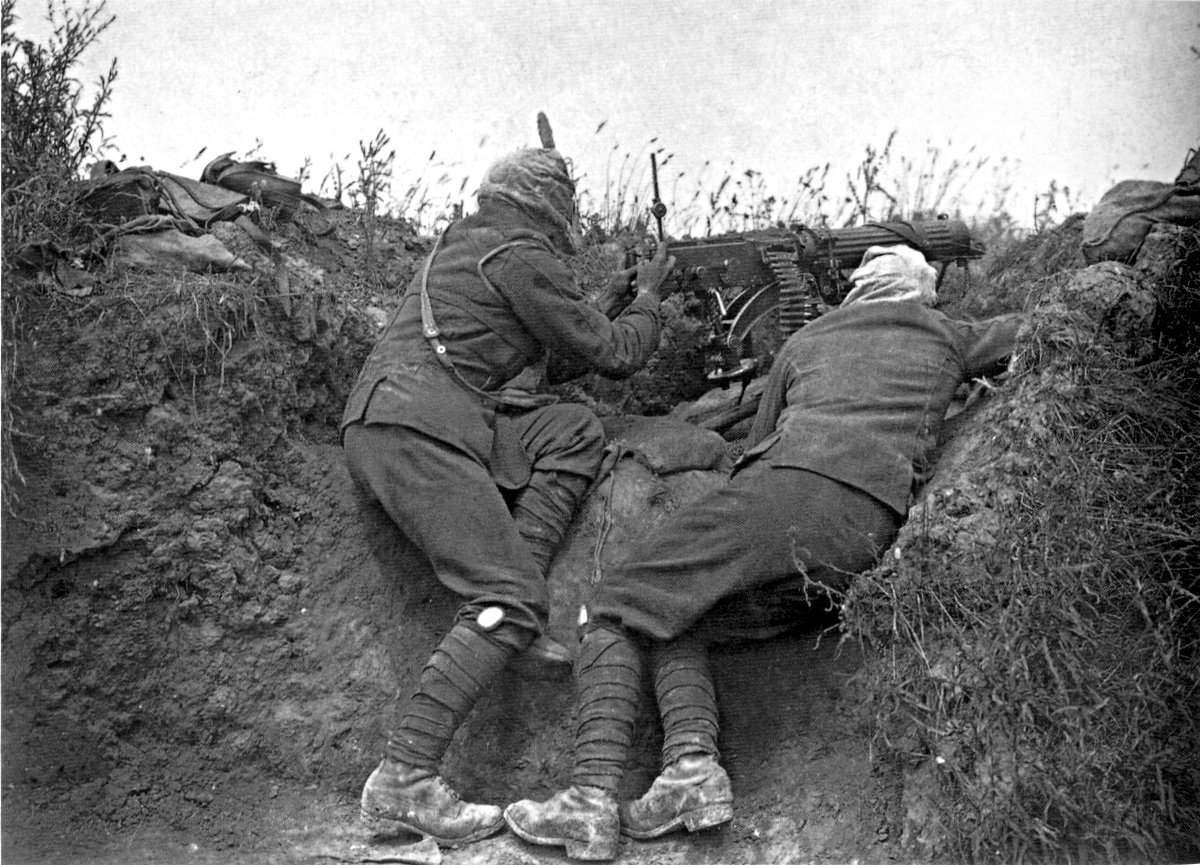
Rear view of Vickers gun team in action at the Battle of the Somme.

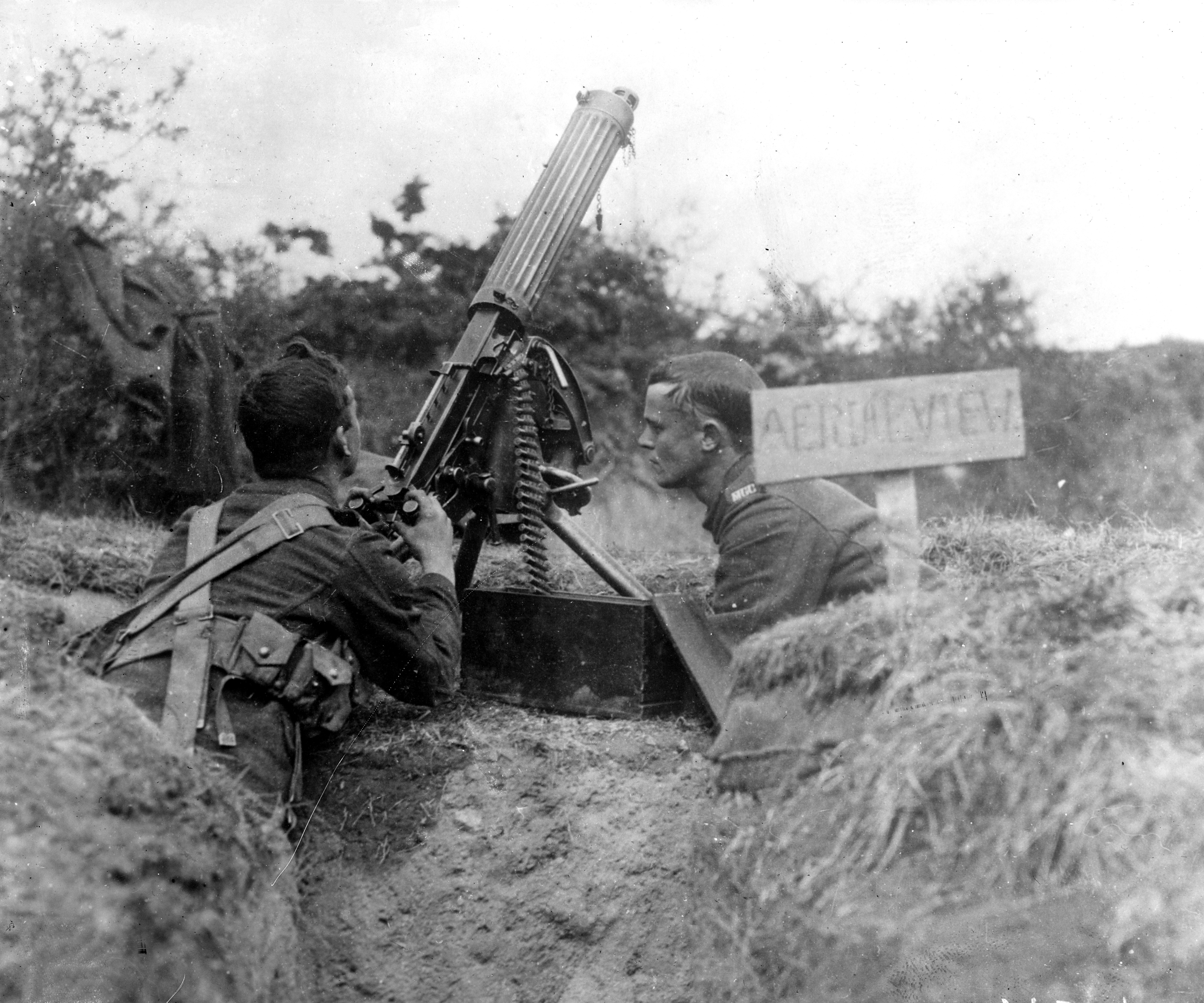
Vickers gun set up for anti-aircraft purposes during the First World War.

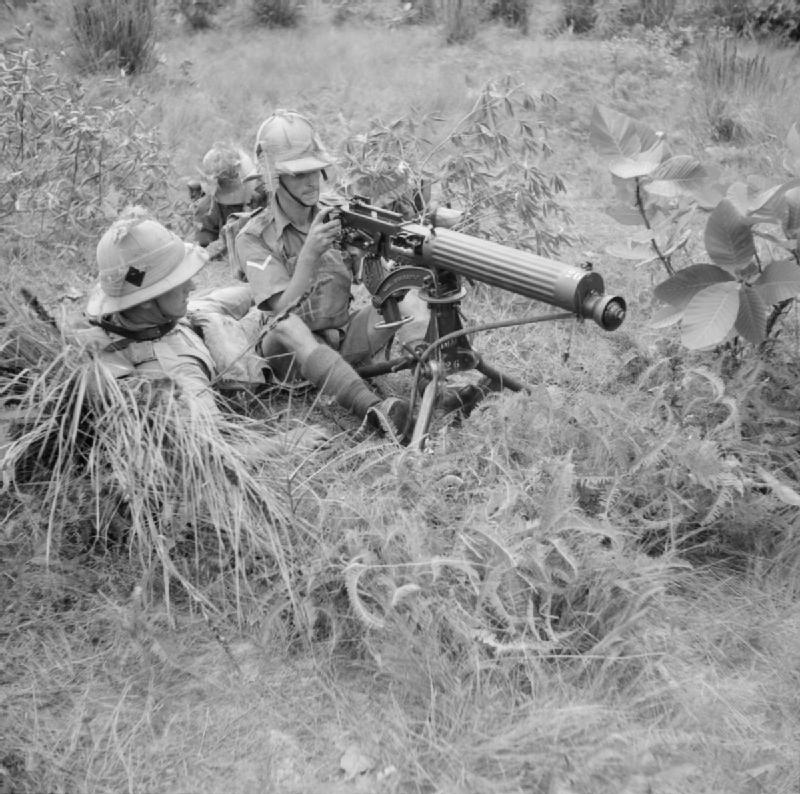
Vickers machine-gun of the 1st Manchester Regiment in Malaya, 1941.

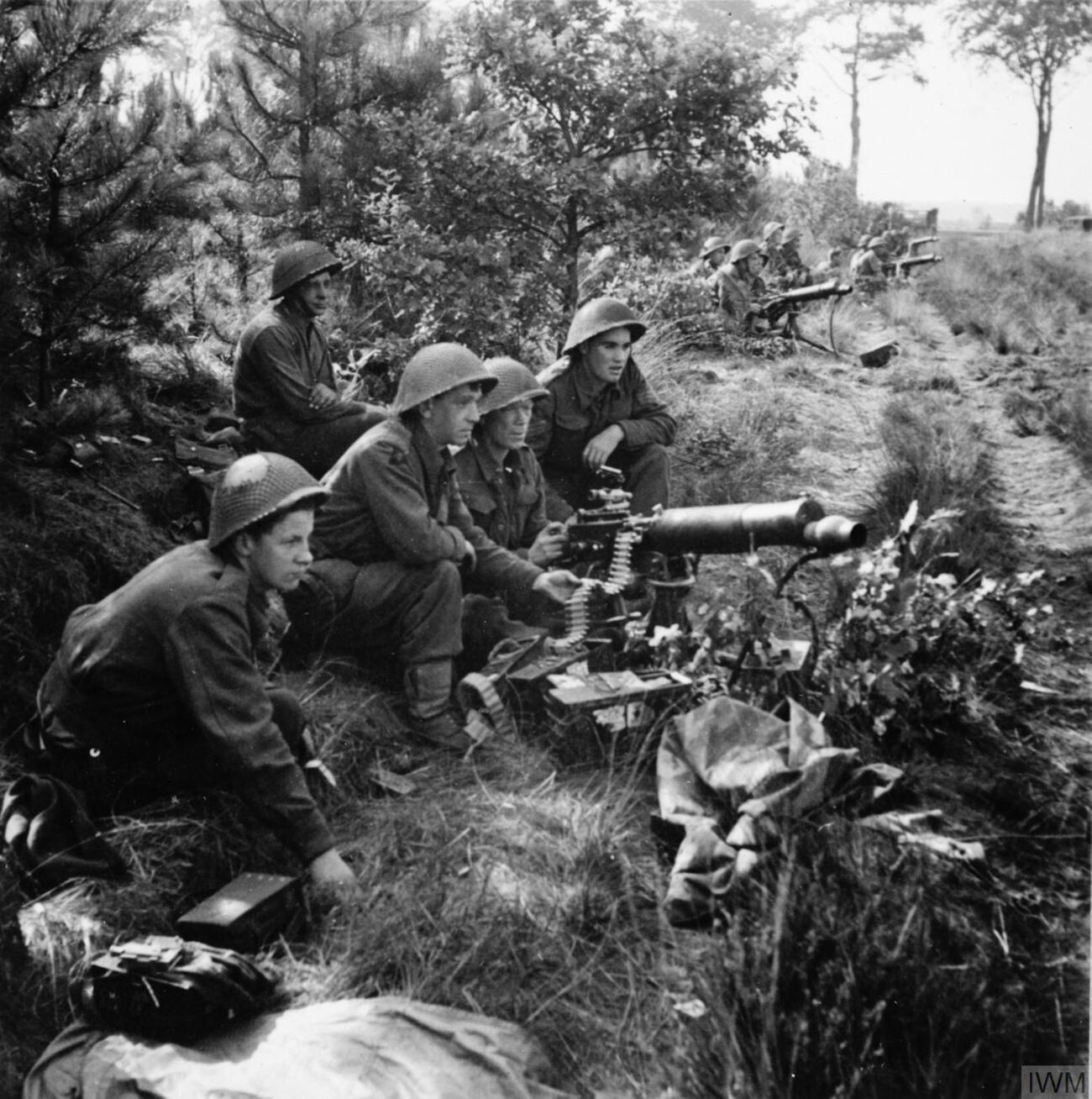
British Vickers gunners in action in the Netherlands during Operation Market Garden. All are wearing the Mk III Turtle helmet.

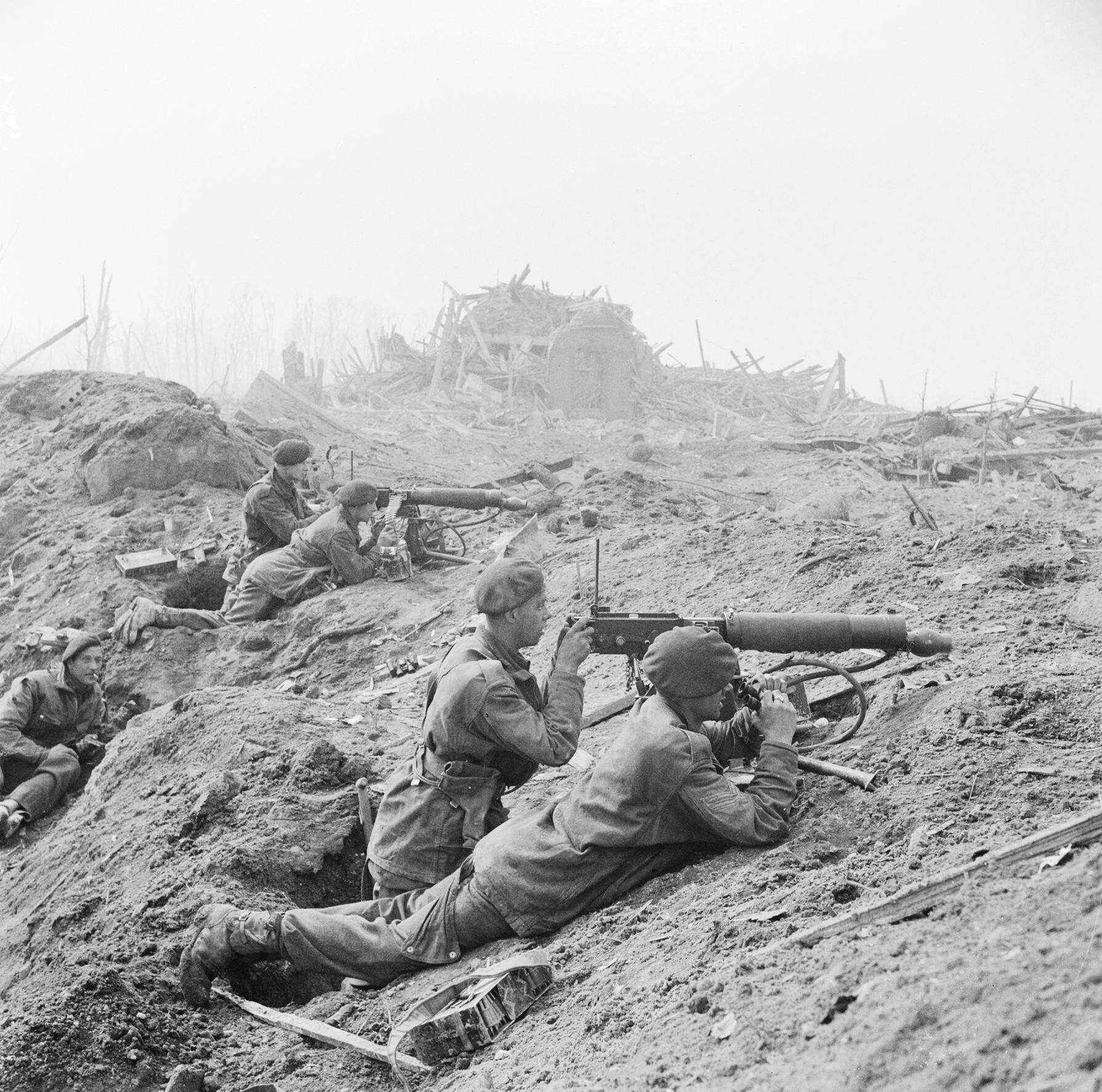
British commandos on the outskirts of Wesel during Operation Plunder in 1945.

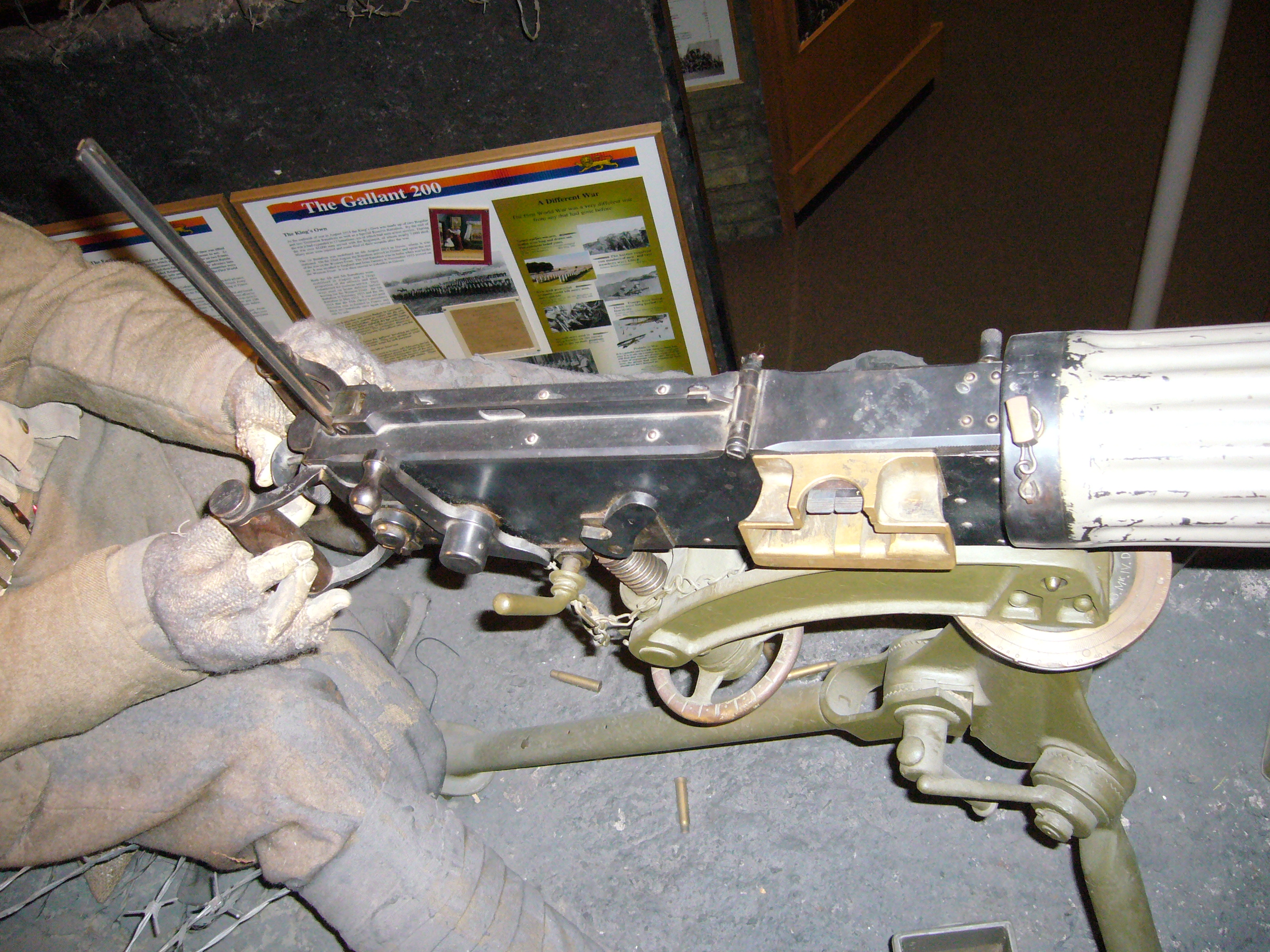
View of the breech of a Vickers gun showing brass feed ramp.

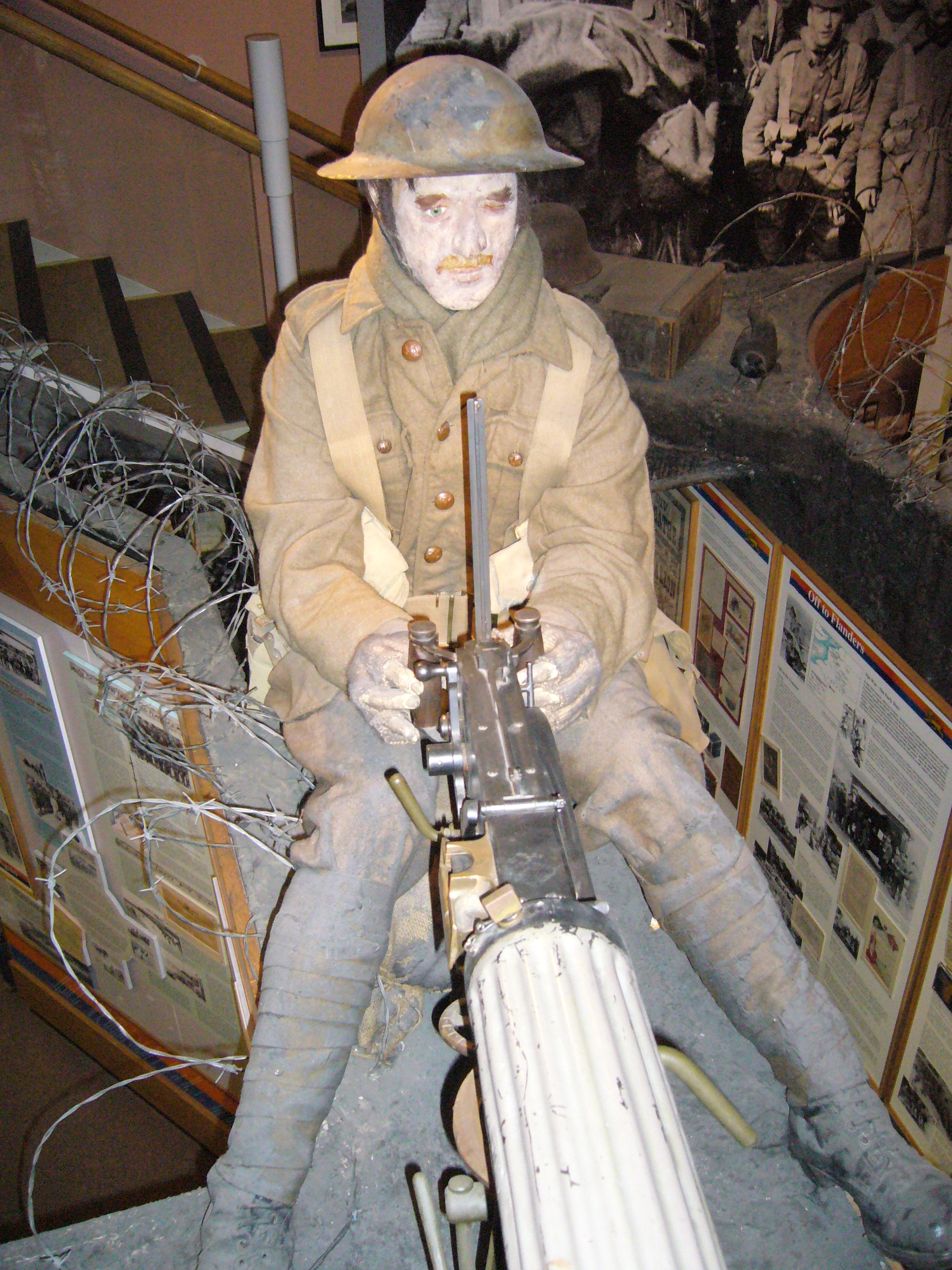
Dorsal view of a Vickers gun showing fluted water-cooling tank.

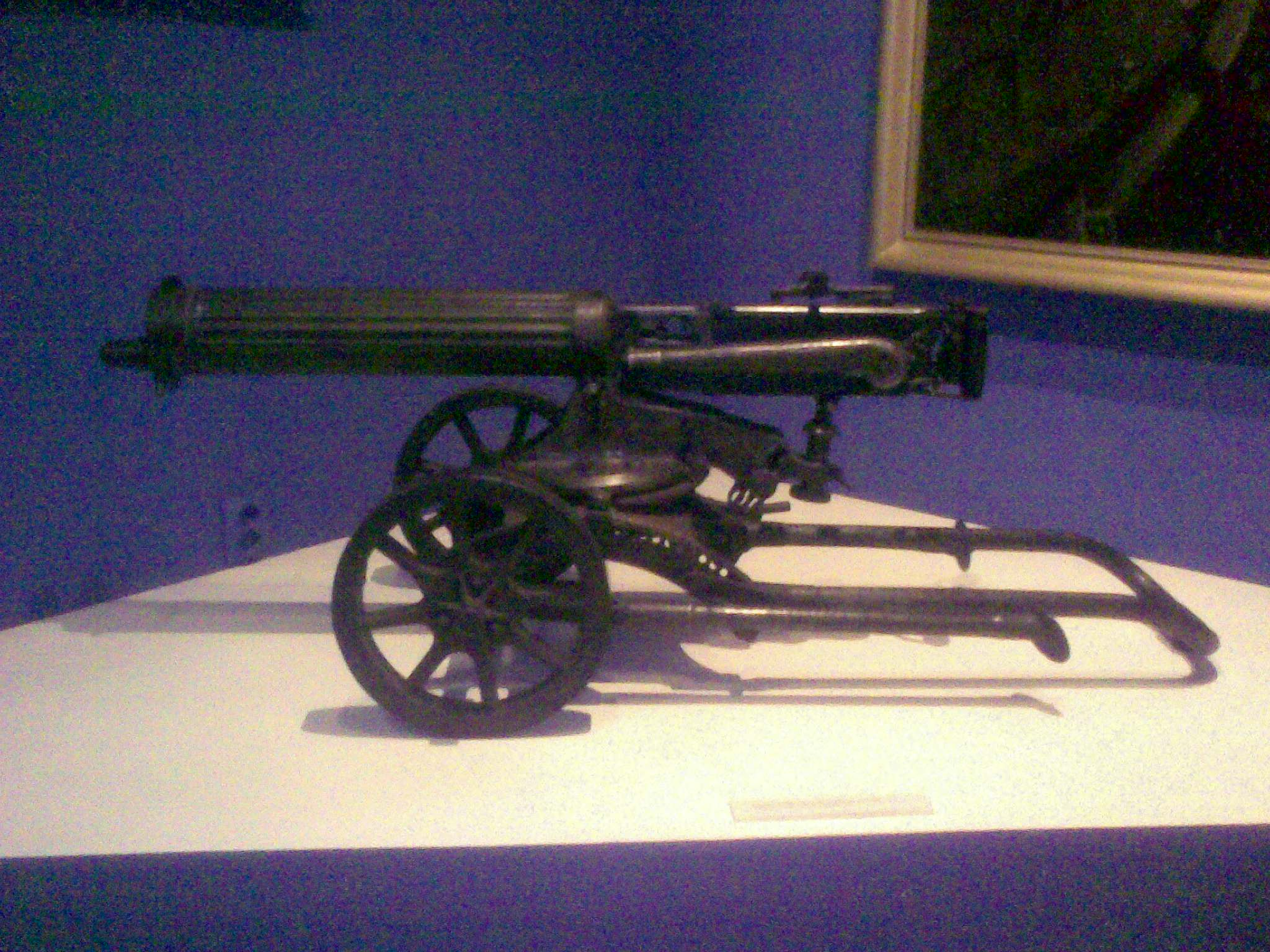
Vickers machine gun from Polish Army Museum's collection.

== See also ==
- Vickers .50 machine gun

=== Weapons of comparable role, performance and era ===
- Hotchkiss Mle 1914 machine gun – French
- Marlin M1917/1918 machine gun
- M1917 Browning machine gun – United States
- Maxim gun - British
- MG 08 – German Maxim machine gun
- Parabellum MG 14 – aircraft version of MG 08 which copied the upwards toggle from Vickers
- PM M1910 – Russian Maxim machine gun
- Schwarzlose machine gun – Austro-Hungarian
