= Killen-Strait =

Defunct American motor vehicle manufacturer

- Industry: Automotive
- Founded: 1913; 113 years ago
- Defunct: 1918; 108 years ago
- Headquarters: Appleton, Wisconsin
- Products: tractors

Killen-Strait was an American engineering company.

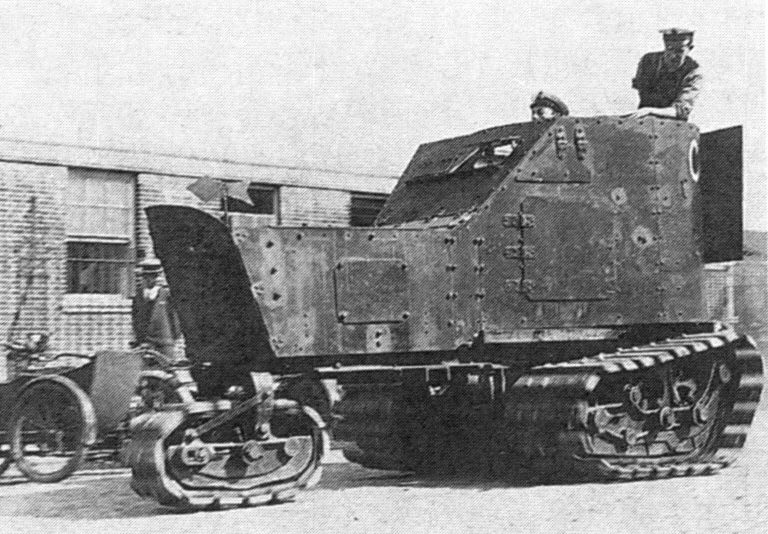
The Killen-Strait Armoured Tractor, an experimental armoured tracked vehicle

== History ==
The company made tractors. The company came from Killen-Walsh Manufacturing Company, which changed its name to Killen-Strait in 1914, to build the Strait's Tractor.

== Structure ==
It was based in Appleton, Wisconsin in the USA.

== Products ==
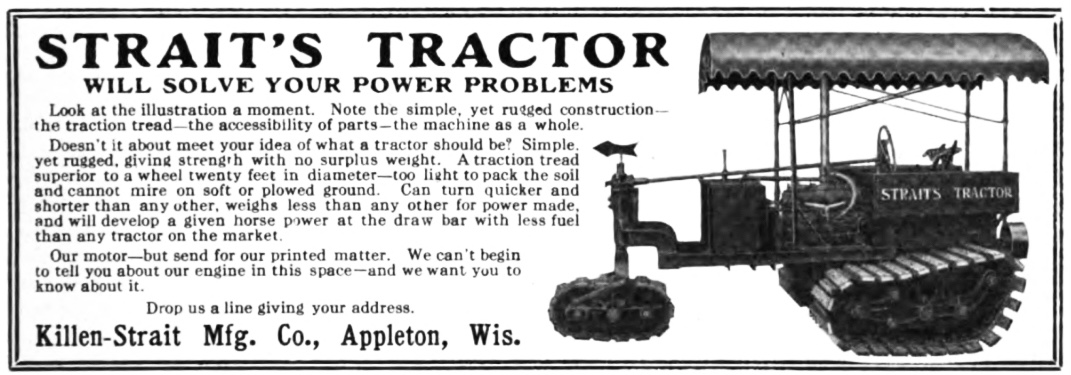
Killen-Strait advertisement (1914)

The Killen-Strait Tractor was powered by a choice of 25-40HP Waukesha Engines, with Remy ignition systems. Two models of tractor were built - a 30-50 model and a 15-30 model.

== Development of the military tank ==
A Killen-Strait Tractor took part in a demonstration on 30 June 1915 at Wembley Park, in front of Winston Churchill and David Lloyd George as a vehicle that could cross obstacles and cut barbed wire. On the same day, the War Office had passed its specification for a machine gun destroyer to the Admiralty's Landship Committee (based at 83 Pall Mall). From the demonstration of the tractor cutting barbed wire, responsibility of the Landship Committee was passed from the Admiralty to the new Ministry of Munitions. The tracked Killen-Strait Tractor significantly inspired the design of what would later that year become the tank. The tracked Killen-Strait Tractor had one track at the front and two at the back. It was fitted with bodywork of an armoured car in 1915.

== See also ==
- History of the tank
