= Landship Committee =

British committee

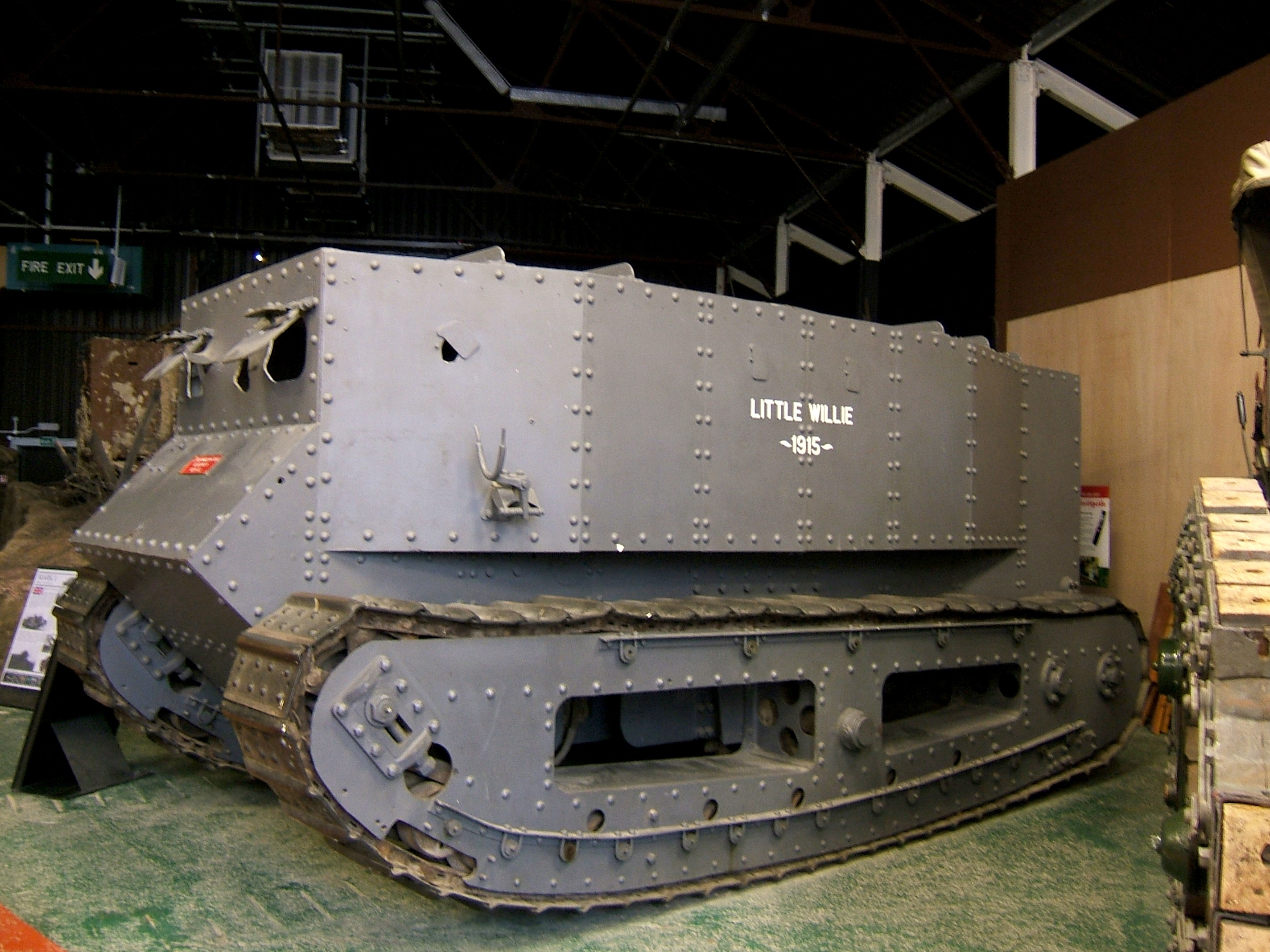
Little Willie at the Tank Museum, Bovington (2006)

The Landship Committee was a small British committee formed during the First World War to develop armoured fighting vehicles for use on the Western Front. The eventual outcome was the creation of what is now called the tank. Established in February 1915 by First Lord of the Admiralty Winston Churchill, the Committee was composed mainly of naval officers, politicians and engineers. It was chaired by Eustace Tennyson-d'Eyncourt, Director of Naval Construction at the Admiralty. For secrecy, by December 1915 the name was changed to "the D.N.C.'s Committee" to disguise its purpose.

== Formation ==
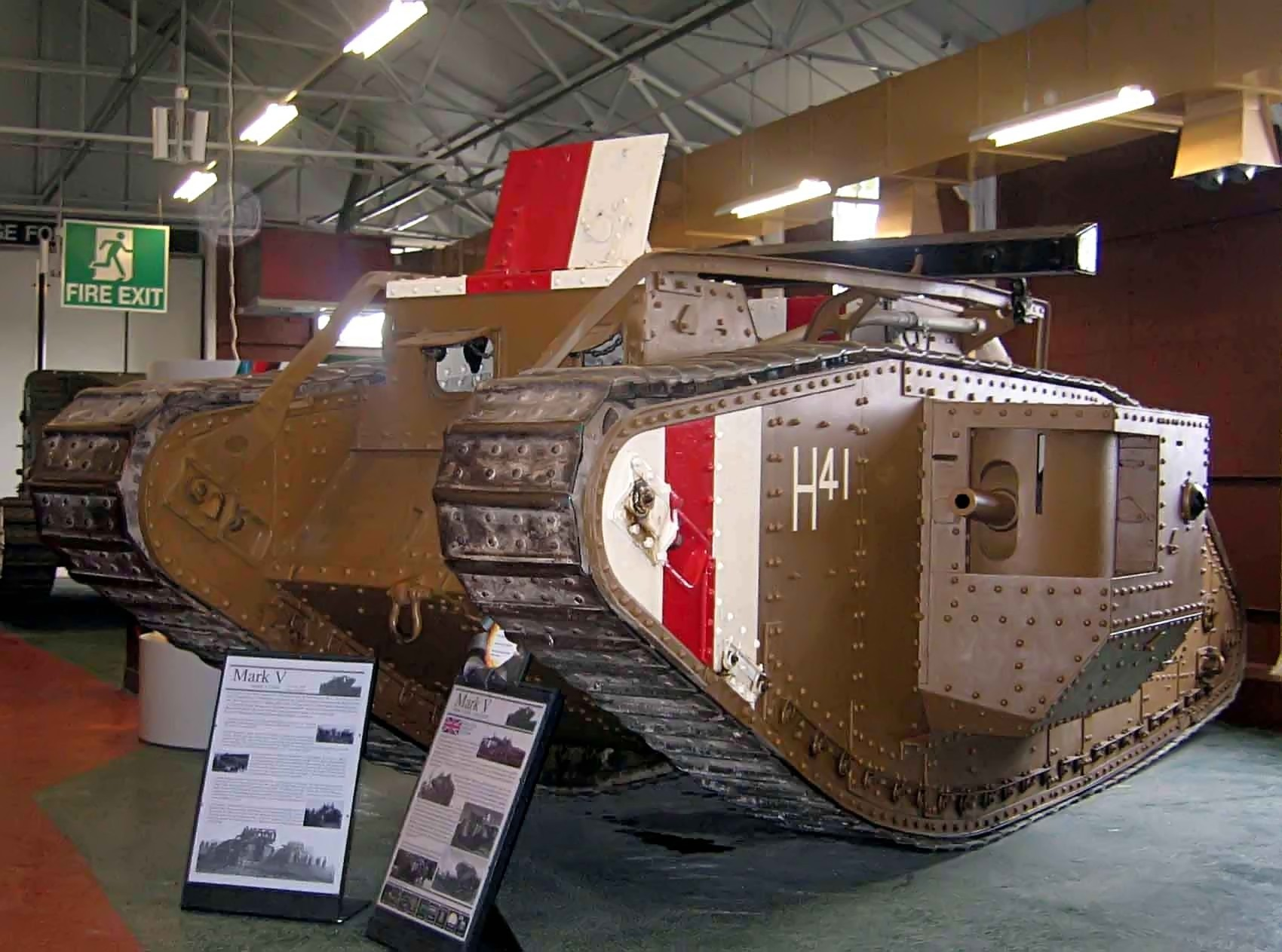
WW1 Mark V tank, in The Tank Museum in Dorset

The committee was formed at Churchill's instruction in February 1915, in part from ideas by Colonel Ernest Swinton, who was then employed as a war correspondent for HM government, and by Maurice Hankey, Secretary of the Committee of Imperial Defence, who wrote Churchill a missive on 26 December 1914. Churchill on 5 January 1915 disclosed the committee notion to Prime Minister H. H. Asquith by letter in which he wrote:

The question to be now solved is not the long attack over a carefully prepared glacis of former times, but the actual getting across of 100 or 200 yards of open space and wire entanglements. All this was apparent more than two months ago, but no steps have been taken and no preparations made. Yet it would be quite easy to fit up tractors with armoured shelters, in which men and machine guns could be placed, which would be bullet proof. The caterpillar system would enable trenches to be crossed quite easily, and the weight of the machines would destroy all wire entanglements. These engines could . . . advance into the enemy's trenches, smash all obstructions, and sweep the trenches with their machine gun fire.

The committee started with only three members: d'Eyncourt, as chairman; Flight Commander Thomas Hetherington of the Royal Naval Air Service Armoured Car Squadron; and Colonel Wilfred Dumble of the Naval Brigade. Hetherington had proposed a large wheeled landship, estimated to weigh some 300 tons. A former Royal Engineer, Dumble had managed the London Omnibus Co. and been brought back to service in response to the urgent need for transport by the Royal Naval Division in Antwerp; he had been an adjutant to Colonel R. E. B. Crompton, who was trying to develop cross-country vehicles for the Army. Dumble recommended Crompton to the committee as an expert on heavy traction.

The committee's activities were concealed from Kitchener at the War Office, the Board of the Admiralty, and the Treasury, all of whom were expected to block the project. Experiments were performed on the grounds of Hatfield House, the home of the Marquess of Salisbury.

== Tank development ==
The Committee conducted a number of trials with various wheeled and tracked vehicles, and work was in progress on a prototype vehicle (later to become Little Willie) when in July 1915 the Committee's existence came to the attention of the War Office. This led to its operations being taken over by the Army and a number of its members transferring from the Navy. From December, 1915 the word "tank" was adopted as a codename for the vehicles in development, and the Landship Committee became known officially as the Tank Supply Committee.

== Tank deployment ==
The tank was first deployed to the battle of the Somme in September 1916.

== Immediate aftermath ==
In 1919 the Royal Commission on Awards to Inventors held a session to determine the inventor of the tank.

== See also ==
The Land Ironclads

== Footnotes ==
=== Bibliography ===
- Hankey, Maurice, The Supreme Command, Volume I (1914-1918), London: Allen 1961
- Miles, W. (1938). Military Operations, France and Belgium, 1916. 2nd July 1916 to the end of the battles of the Somme (IWM & Battery Press 1992 ed.). London: HMSO. ISBN 0-90162-776-3.
- Encyclopædia Britannica. Admiralty Landships Committee. Retrieved 8 July 2012.
- Fletcher, David; Harley, Dick. Tankette, Volume 15, Issue 6.
- Glanfield, John. The Devil's Chariots, 2001.
- Stern, Albert. Albert Stern Papers, Liddell Hart Centre for Military Archives, King's College London.
- Sueter, Murray. The Evolution of the Tank, 1937.
- Swinton, Major-General Sir Ernest D. Eyewitness Doubleday, Doran & Co, (1933)
- Hochschild, Adam, To End All Wars: A Story of Loyalty and Rebellion: 1914-1918, Boston: Houghton, 2011
