= Walter Dally Jones =

British soldier

Walter Dally Jones (21 May 1855, Wandsworth – 20 September 1926) was a British soldier. He was assistant secretary to the Committee of Imperial Defence from 1914 to 1919.

Dally Jones was educated at Harrow and Trinity College, Cambridge before he joined the British Army in 1878. He served in the 99th (Lanarkshire) Regiment of Foot with postings in Natal, Bermuda and the East Indies. He was Deputy-Assistant-Adjutant-General for Gibraltar in 1891 to 1898 and then took on the role of press censor for General Redvers Buller during the Boer War.

He is credited, along with fellow officer Lieutenant-Colonel Ernest Swinton, with having initiated on Christmas Eve 1915, the use of the word "tank" as a code-name for the world's first tracked armoured fighting vehicles produced by Great Britain.

When David Lloyd George established the War Cabinet in December 1916, Dally Jones assisted Maurice Hankey, the secretary, in recording the decisions.
