= Lancelot de Mole =

Australian engineer and inventor (1880–1950)

Lancelot de Mole CBE
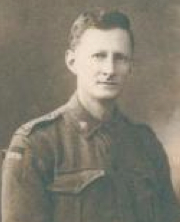
- de Mole in AIF uniform in 1917
- Born: Lancelot Eldin de Mole; 13 March 1880; Adelaide, South Australia, Australia
- Died: 6 May 1950 (aged 70); Liverpool, New South Wales, Australia
- Occupations: Mechanical engineer, inventor
- Known for: Premature design of the tank

Signature
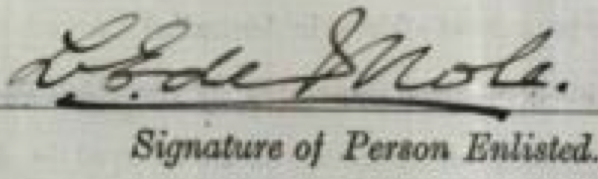

Lancelot Eldin "Lance" de Mole CBE (13 March 1880 – 6 May 1950) was an Australian engineer and inventor.

He made several approaches to the British authorities, in 1912, 1914, and 1916, with plans for a vehicle driven by a type of caterpillar track, believing that it could have a military application. It was ahead of its time because in 1912 the need for such a military device had not yet arisen. To further complicate matters, his correspondence was set aside due to various bureaucratic blunders, and was not given to the appropriate officers.

In 1919, three years after the first military tanks had been built and used in warfare during World War I, a Royal Commission acknowledged the potential of de Mole's innovative vehicle. The commission noted the unfortunate consequences of his submissions being overlooked, and that while his designs had no influence on the actual development of the tank, tanks might have been developed much earlier if his idea had been properly investigated.

== Family and early life ==
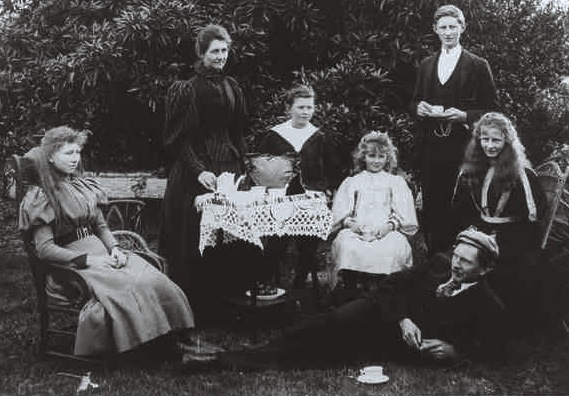
The de Mole family at tea, c.1896s: left to right: Florence, Mrs. de Mole, Clive, Gladys, Lance, Winifred, and Mr. de Mole, foreground.

The eldest of the five children of William Frederick de Mole (1852–1939), an architect and surveyor, and Emily de Mole (1858–1941), née Moulden, Lancelot Eldin de Mole was born in Willunga, South Australia, on 13 March 1880.

His family moved to Victoria when he was seven years old, and he was educated at the Melbourne Church of England Grammar School until 1891, and then at the Berwick Grammar School. After leaving school he trained as an engineering draftsman.

He had three sisters and one brother: Florence Louise de Mole (1881–1966) (later Mrs. Feldtmann), Winifred Emily de Mole (1886–1903), Clive Moulden de Mole (1886–1934), and Gladys Rose de Mole (1887–1979). Clive de Mole enlisted in the First Australian Imperial Force on 9 September 1914. He was wounded in action in the Dardanelles on 28 June 1915, receiving a gunshot wound and a fracture to his left arm, and was invalided back to Australia in March 1916. He was promoted to Second Lieutenant on 1 January 1919, and to Lieutenant on 1 April 1919. He was discharged from the AIF in the U.K. in September 1919.

Lancelot de Mole married Harriet Josephine Walter (1890–1957) on 21 July 1915.

== Pioneering design for a tracked fighting vehicle ==
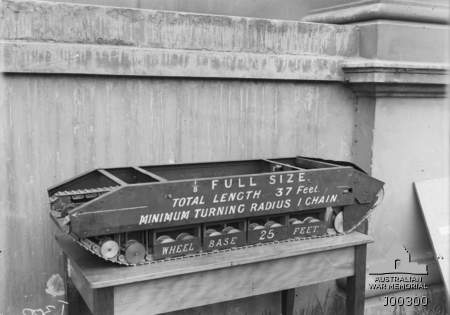
de Mole's scale model at AWM.

In 1911, while he was working as a surveyor in Western Australia, travelling through rough terrain inspired de Mole to work on ideas for tracked vehicles. These included a tracked armoured fighting vehicle ("chain-rail vehicle which could be easily steered and carry heavy loads over rough ground and trenches"), which he submitted to the British War Office in 1912. In June 1913, he received a reply that his idea had been rejected.

== Military service ==
Following the outbreak of World War I, de Mole volunteered for overseas service with the Australian Imperial Force (AIF). For three years he was rejected as medically unfit was finally accepted for active service on 26 September 1917. He was assigned to the 10th Battalion, in France. He was with the battalion in April 1918, during the Battle of Hazebrouck, but spent the last few months of the war in hospital after contracting influenza.

=== Royal Commission on Awards to Inventors ===
de Mole wrote to the British Munitions Inventions Department on 19 June 1919 seeking remuneration for the expenses he had incurred in submitting his invention to the Department for use during the war.

His inventions were among those assessed in 1919 by the British Royal Commission on Awards to Inventors, conducted by Mr Justice Sargant, investigated the claims of twelve persons (10 individuals, including de Mole, and one pair) relating to the invention of tanks, delivered its findings and recommendations on 27 November 1919.

The commission's Report announced that "in estimating the value of the invention of the Tanks for the purpose of [our] recommendations, we have taken into account not merely the precise class of Tanks which went into action at the Battle of the Somme, but also any modified or improved classes of Tanks which may fairly be considered to result from the normal development of the inherent potentialities of the original invention". Notwithstanding this, however, the Report continued, "we have not taken into account any special or exceptional inventions which may subsequently have been applied and have resulted in substantial extra utility".

Before anything else, the Commissioner registered his view that, "the general idea of the use of such an instrument of warfare as the "Tank" was converted into a practical shape ... was primarily due to the receptivity, courage, and driving force of Mr. Winston Churchill"; and, as well, that it should be placed on record that Churchill had made no claim, because "Mr. Churchill has very properly taken the view that all his thought and time belonged to the State, and that he was not entitled to make any claim for an award, even had he wished to do so".

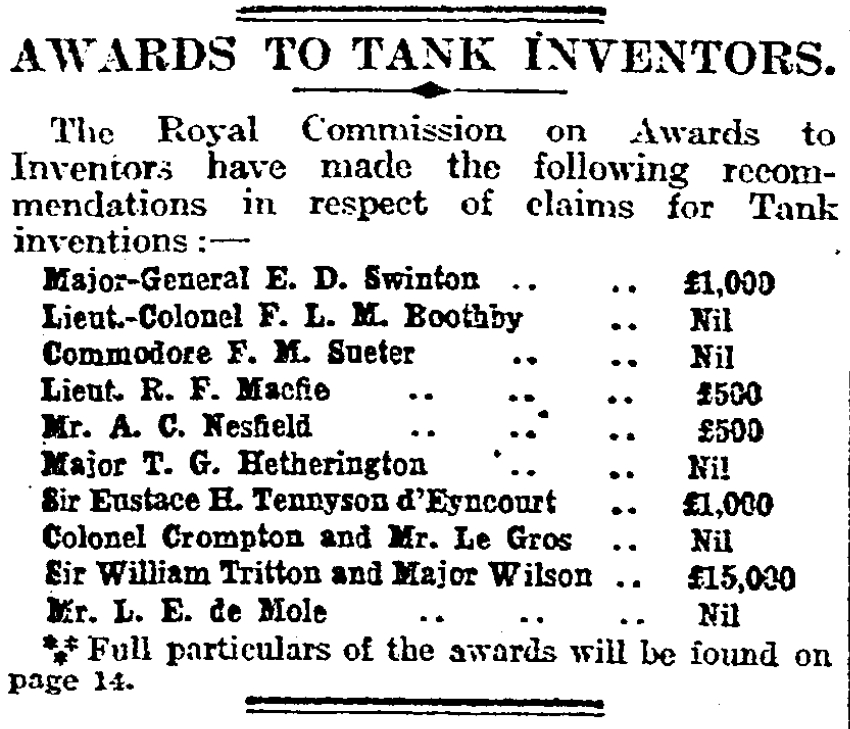
The Times, 28 November 1919, p.12.

Sir William Tritton and Major W.G. Wilson were jointly awarded £15,000, and were recognized for "designing and producing a concrete practical shape the novel and efficient engine of warfare known as the "Tank""; the Commissioner emphasized that the considerable design difficulties that were experienced when the tanks took the field of action, which were rapidly remedied, were a consequence of inadequate specifications by the government, and were not due to any design faults on the part of Tritton or Wilson.

Sir Eustace Tennyson d'Eyncourt, the Director of Naval Construction and Chairman of the Landships Committee, and Major-General E.D. Swinton were each awarded £1,000, for their work in advocating the overall concept, setting design specifications, and overseeing the project.

Mr. Albert Collinson Nesfield and Lieutenant Robert Francis Macfie were each awarded £500 for the separate and independent "conception, embodiment, and communication of the same set of ideas".

The Royal Commission rejected the claims of Lieutenant-Colonel Frederick Lewis Maitland Boothby, Commodore M.F. Sueter, Major Thomas Gerard Hetherington — the separate claims of Boothby, Sueter, and Hetherington were rejected on the grounds that the important services that they had rendered came within the scope of their military employment — and that of Colonel R.E.B. Crompton and his assistant Mr. Lucien Alphonse Legros, on the basis that they had "worked loyally and very hard" at their allotted tasks, they had been well-paid as consulting engineers, and had neither invented nor discovered any of the special features that were ultimately incorporated in the tanks.

In de Mole's case, however, the commission's Report was far more sympathetic:

The case of this claimant was heard a few days after the conclusion of the other cases. We consider that he is entitled to the greatest credit for having made and reduced to practical shape as far back as the year 1912 a very brilliant invention which anticipated and in some respects surpassed that actually put into use in the year 1916. It was this claimant's misfortune and not his fault that his invention was in advance of his time, and failed to be appreciated and was put aside because the occasion for its use had not then arisen. We regret exceedingly that we are unable to recommend any award to him. But we are bound to adhere to the general rule in such cases as these that a claimant must show a causal connexion between the making of his invention and the user of any similar invention by the Government.

The commission finally recognised the brilliance of de Mole's design, even declaring that it was superior to the machines actually developed, but because of its narrow remit the commission was unable to recommend an award. However, de Mole was told that if he were to make a claim for out-of-pocket expenses, it would be regarded favourably. He was asked to supply a detailed statement of his expenditure on the project, and was reimbursed in the sum of £987 (about £50,000 2019 value).

== Later life and honours ==
He was made an honorary corporal in 1919; and, early in 1920, it was announced from London that he had been appointed a Commander of the Most Excellent Order of the British Empire (CBE). At the formal investiture of the award, on 28 July 1921, in the ballroom of the New South Wales' State Government House, Lord Forster, the seventh Governor-General of Australia, was so nervous that he dropped the decoration before it could be pinned on de Mole's chest.

de Mole also made his case for financial compensation to the Australian government. Inquiries from that government to the British one yielded little but polite responses that de Mole's ideas had unfortunately been too advanced for their time and thus were not recognized as they should have been.

After the war de Mole became an engineer in the design branch of the Sydney Water Board.

He died at Liverpool, New South Wales, on 6 May 1950.

A model of the fighting vehicle he proposed in 1912 is displayed at the Australian War Memorial, Canberra.

== Patents ==
Applications for Australian patents

- 1902: Australasian Mining Patents: Oylndrical ore concentrator, West Australia, February 7. No.3723 — L. E. de Mole, Kalgoorlie, W.A.
- 1902: Australasian Mining Patents: Concentrator — L. E. de Mole, Brighton, Victoria: A cylindrical ore concentrator. Victoria, May 14, No.19,079.
- 1902: Inventions and Patents: An improved method of and apparatus for automatically operating telephone exchanges (provisional); No.7898; application made week ending 30 August 1902.

US patents

- US patent no.1,408,569, (held by Lancelot Eldin de Mole), dated 7 March 1922 (filed 4 March 1920), for a "Road Vehicle".
- US patent no.1,448,056, (held by Lancelot Eldin de Mole), dated 13 March 1923 (filed 17 July 1920), for a "Differential or Balance Gear".
- US patent no.1,737,573, (held by Lancelot Eldin de Mole), dated 3 December 1929 (filed 14 March 1925), for a "Changing Sign and Display Apparatus".

== See also ==
- Günther Burstyn – Austro-Hungarian Army officer
- History of the tank – Chronicle of armoured combat vehicles
- Landship Committee – British committee
- Royal Commission on Awards to Inventors – UK Royal Commission
