= The Defence of Duffer's Drift =

Book by Ernest Dunlop Swinton

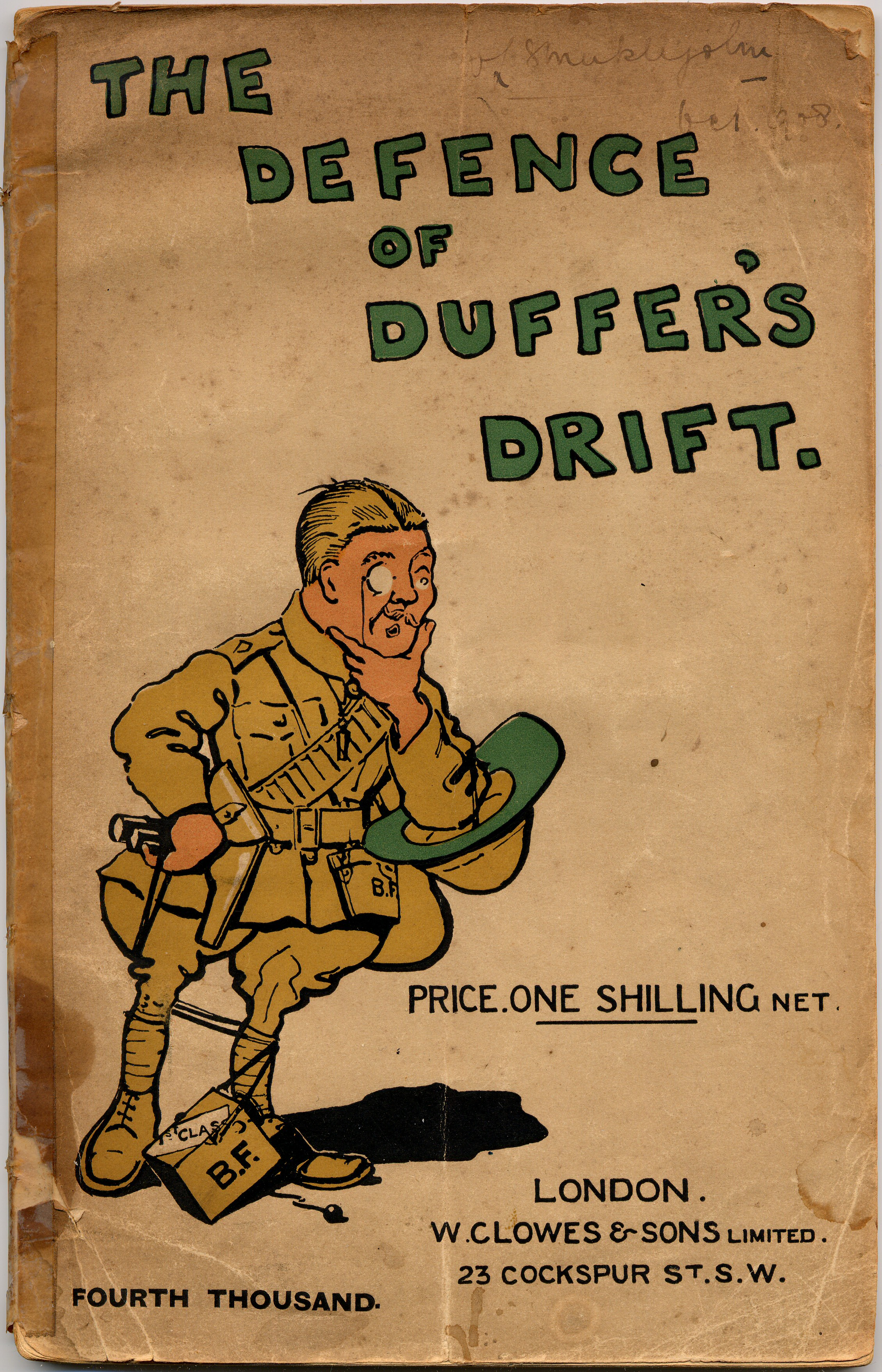
- Front cover, with the initials "B. F." (Note: The box wrapped around the officer's legs is marked with the initials "BF", which could stand for the author's pseudonym "Backsight Forethought" as on the title page, but the label "BF First Class" could also be read as "Bloody Fool, First Class".)
- Author: Ernest Swinton, writing as "Backsight Forethought"
- Language: English
- Genre: Military art and science
- Publisher: W. Clowes & Sons, London, reprinted from the United Service Magazine
- Publication date: 1904
- Pages: 39

The Defence of Duffer's Drift is a short 1904 book by the British Army officer Ernest Swinton.

Lieutenant Backsight Forethought (BF) and his command of fifty men are given the task to defend Duffer's Drift, a natural ford to a river. A large force of Boers, unknown to BF, is moving toward his position. This scenario is played out six times, in six "dreams". In the early scenarios, BF and his British troops are ignominiously defeated. After each defeat, BF learns lessons and adapts his strategy for the later encounters. The later dreams end more inconclusively, and in the final dream, BF and his command hold out long enough to be relieved. The book encourages critical thinking and careful use of position and terrain to mount a successful defence.

The book has been reprinted and imitated many times and new adaptations continue to appear in the 21st century, especially in the United States.

== History ==
=== Context ===
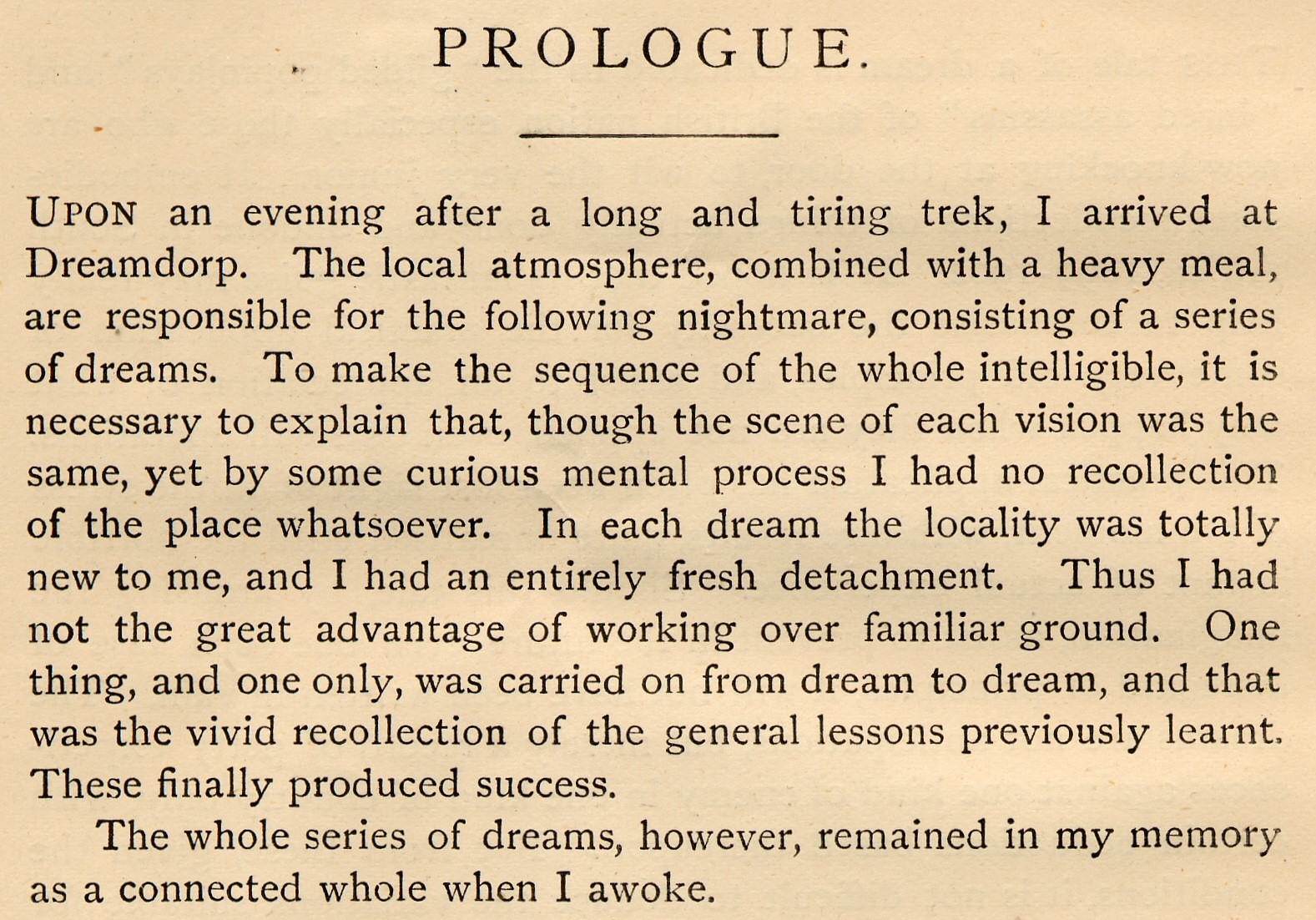
Start of the prologue.

At the start of the 20th century, Ernest Swinton was a field officer in the British Army. The text first appeared in the British United Service Magazine under the pseudonym, Lieutenant N. Backsight Forethought ("BF") who is the narrator of the book.) The book is an exploration of small unit tactics in a fictional encounter in the Second Boer War. Swinton was a captain of the Royal Engineers in South Africa during the Boer War and the book "embodies some recollections of things actually done and undone in South Africa, 1899–1902".

=== Publication history ===
The Defence of Duffer's Drift was published in England by William Clowes & Sons in 1904. It was reprinted in the April 1905 edition of the Journal of the United States Infantry Association. The book, especially intended for young lieutenants, has become a military staple on small unit tactics, read far afield in places such as the United States, Russia and Canada. While some of the advice has become rather dated—notably, BF eventually decides to imprison all nearby locals, shoot any livestock that could be of aid to the enemy and impress Boers and Africans alike into building fortifications for his men, an "approach to the human terrain that would spell disaster" in modern times—the book is still considered relevant and interesting.

Clowes reprinted the book many times, including in 1907, 1909, 1911, 1913, 1914, 1916, 1924, 1929, 1935, 1940 and 1941. An edition was brought out by Clowes in conjunction with Angus & Robertson in Sydney, Australia in 1916. G. Ronald of Oxford brought out a new edition in 1949. A Hebrew translation was printed in Tel Aviv in 1952. Editions were printed for the US Infantry magazine in 1972 and for the Combat Studies Institute of the United States Army Command and General Staff College in 1974; both were reprinted in later years, with a brief preface that encouraged readers to think through the challenge for themselves. In 1986, Avery Publishing of New Jersey printed a new edition. The US Marine Corps printed an edition in 1989. Leo Cooper of London printed a 1990 version. In 2009, Merchant Books of Oregon produced an edition and in 2010 Kessinger Publishing of Montana did the same.

== Storyline ==
Lieutenant Backsight Forethought, a newly-commissioned officer in the British Army, is put in command of a platoon of soldiers to defend Duffer's Drift, a key crossing-place on the Silliassvogel River. In a series of six dreams, he imagines deploying his troops to hold off the Boer forces.

In his first two dreams, the British force is ambushed without much of a fight. Fortifications are not prepared and the sentries announce their locations, allowing the Boers to easily sneak up and defeat the sleepy British soldiers without resistance. In the third and fourth dreams, BF takes more active defensive preparations - digging trenches, arresting the local Boer civilians rather than attempting to trade or communicate with them and impounding them and local African civilians for slave labour. While able to slow the Boers down some, poor placement of trenches, lack of supplies, obvious fortifications that the enemy can easily detect and plan around and other problems hamper the British resistance. The fifth and sixth dreams are the most successful; in them, BF creates a spread-out and concealed force that greatly hampers and slows the enemy, even to the point of turning them back in the sixth dream, which allows for BF to obtain reinforcements.

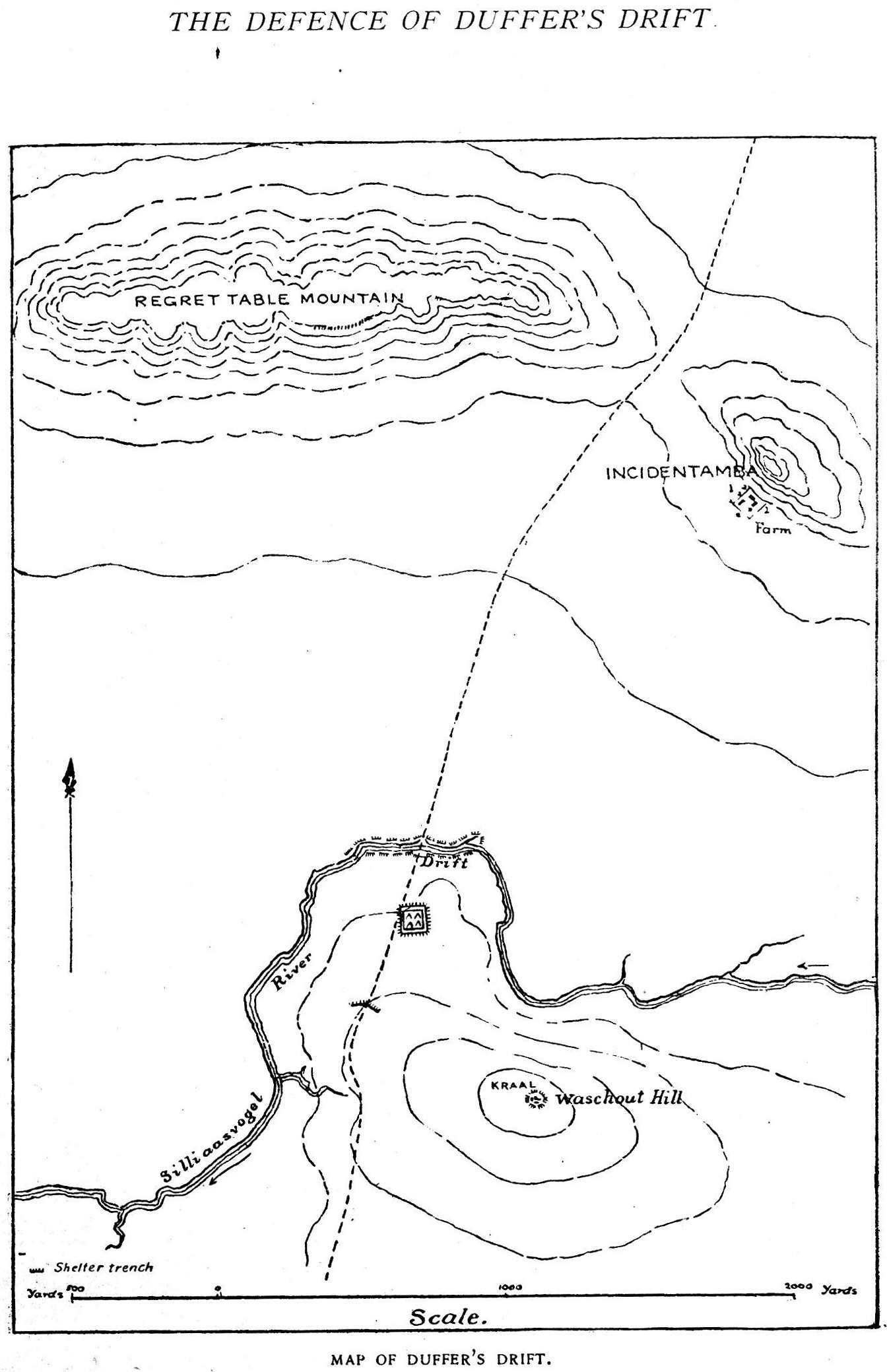
Map of Duffer's Drift, the Silliaasvogel River's only crossing. The defences are on the slopes of Waschout Hill to the south. Across the river to the north are Regret Table Mountain and the hillside farm of Incidentamba.

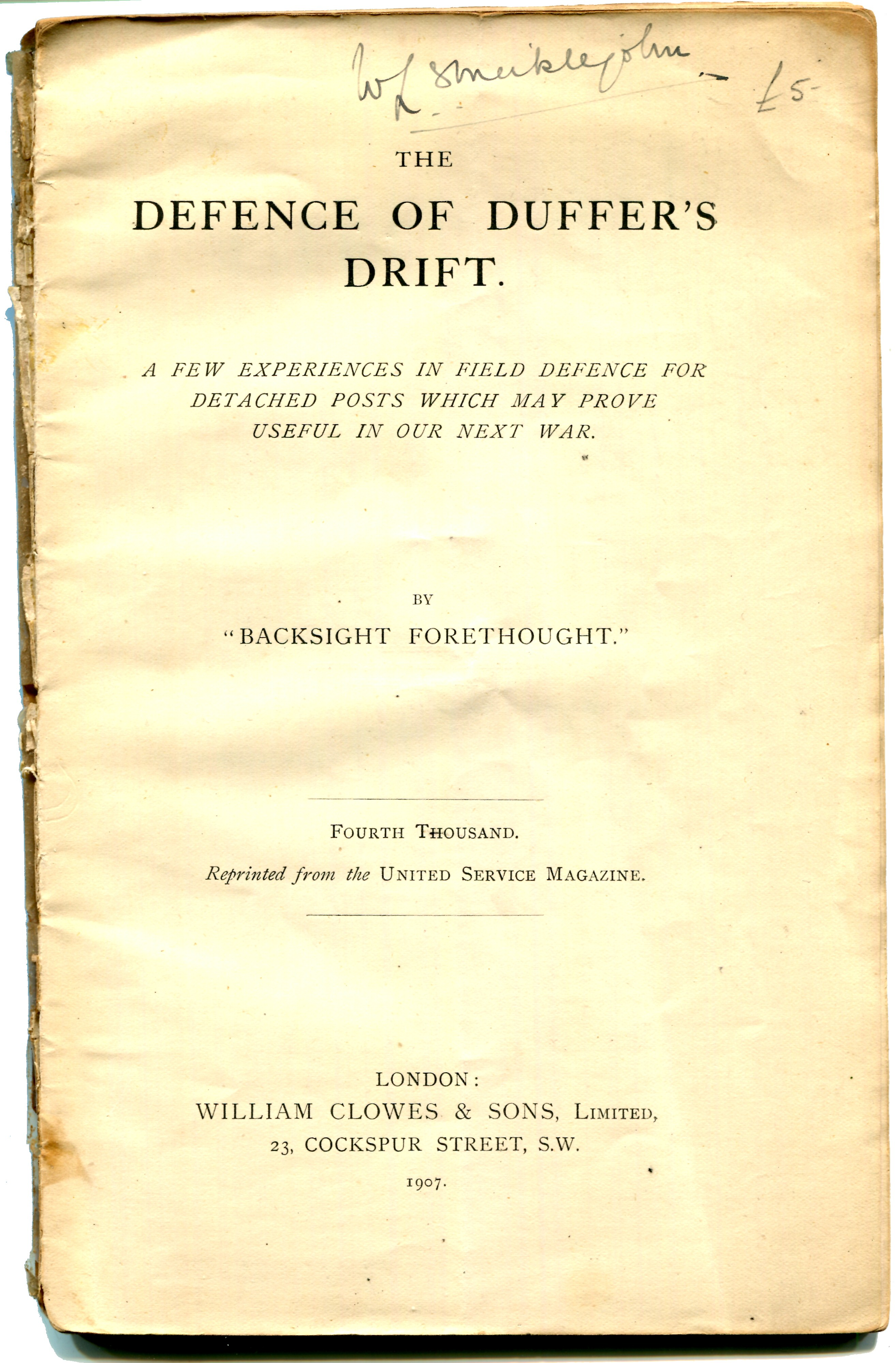
Title page, with pseudonymous byline "Backsight Forethought"

== Influence ==
Influence of Ernest Swinton's 1904 booklet "The Defence of Duffer's Drift" on American military thinking

The Defence of Duffer's Drift's style of literary fiction has been copied by several authors, especially in the United States. Some examples are provided below, including a primer on World War I battalion level combined arms tactics incorporating new types of warfare (tanks, machine guns, and aviation) a mechanised battalion level primer, a military combat service support example and one adopting the parable to operations in Iraq.

The first example is Battle of Booby's Bluffs, originally published in 1921 by an Army officer under the pseudonym Major Single List. It is important for its "lessons-learned" examination of the new weapons introduced in the Great War (most notably tanks, machine guns and aeroplanes) and how these innovations required learning new combined arms tactics. In the style of Duffer's Drift, a hapless battalion commander faces a battle scenario in a series of six dreams. In the first dream, he makes so many mistakes as to prove catastrophic for him and his men. He learns more about tactics and leadership through each dream, until at last he leads his men to victory through the treacherous terrain of Booby's Bluffs. Included with the dreams are notations to real mistakes made by American commanders during the War.

Defense of Hill 781, written by James R. McDonough in 1988, deals with a somewhat larger combat element than Duffer's Drift, and having a slightly different reason for the "dreams".

The Defense of Duffer's Drift Brigade Support Area was written by Staff Sergeants Reginald Scott and Steve Newman, along with Sergeants William Baucom, Rodney Weathers, and Louise Chee in the September 2001 edition of NCO Notes, number 01-2, from the Association of the United States Army (AUSA) Institute of Land Warfare. Instead of trying to teach infantry tactics, the authors of this story focused upon a supply company of a forward support battalion to teach units inside a Brigade Support Area to become more effective in defensive operations during combat.

The winter 2005 edition of the Canadian Army Journal contained the following praise,

The South African War (1899–1902) provided the next opportunity for literary fiction to play a role in future army concepts. The publication of The Defence of Duffer's Drift by Captain (later Major-General Sir) Ernest Swinton, KBE, CB, DSO, in 1905, was extremely well received and became required reading for many subsequent generations of young officers. Set at a river choke point on some generic veldt anywhere in the Transvaal, the story's main character, a young and energetic Lieutenant Backsight Forethought, has a series of nightmares in which he loses battle after battle against his Boer adversaries. After each dream, however, a series of lessons are highlighted, and each of these was incorporated into the next battle, which eventually leads Lieutenant Forethought to victory and relief in the final dream. Although written as a fictional tale, Swinton's aim was to teach tactical lessons as well as generate discussion and debate on the planning and execution of operations.

— Godefroy, Andrew B., Canadian Army Journal

The Defense of Jisr Al Doreaa is a 2009 novella by two US Army captains, based on The Defence of Duffer's Drift, and meant to teach junior officers how to apply the basic principles of counter-insurgency.

The Defense of Battle Position Duffer is a publication created by the Asymmetric Warfare Group and Johns Hopkins University in 2016 that covers how commanders may integrate the cyber domain with tactical operations at the brigade combat team level. It follows Colonel Backsight Forethought V, a student of the Army War College, in a similar series of dreams where his mission as a brigade commander in varying scenarios are hampered by more cyber-proficient enemy commanders. Eventually, after integrating a litany of lessons learned in dreams, he is able to finally defeat a determined enemy with minimal losses.

Dominating Duffer's Domain is a 2017 report in the Duffer's Drift idiom meant to instruct US Army information operations practitioners.

== Bibliography ==
- Swinton, Ernest Dunlop, writing as "Backsight Forethought" (1904). The Defence of Duffer's Drift. London, reprinted from the United Service Magazine: W. Clowes and Sons.
