= Gunther Burstyn =

Austro-Hungarian Army officer

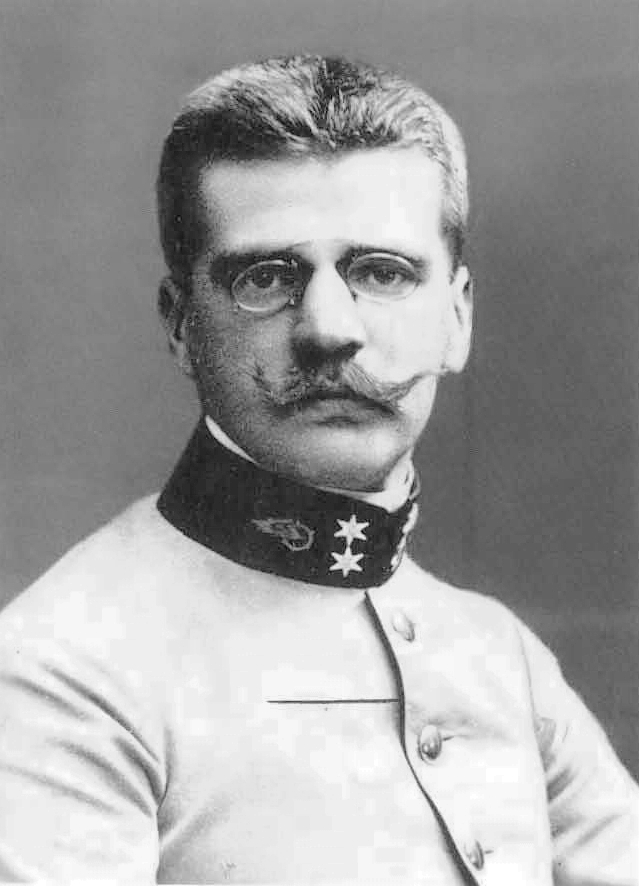
Oberleutnant Gunther Burstyn

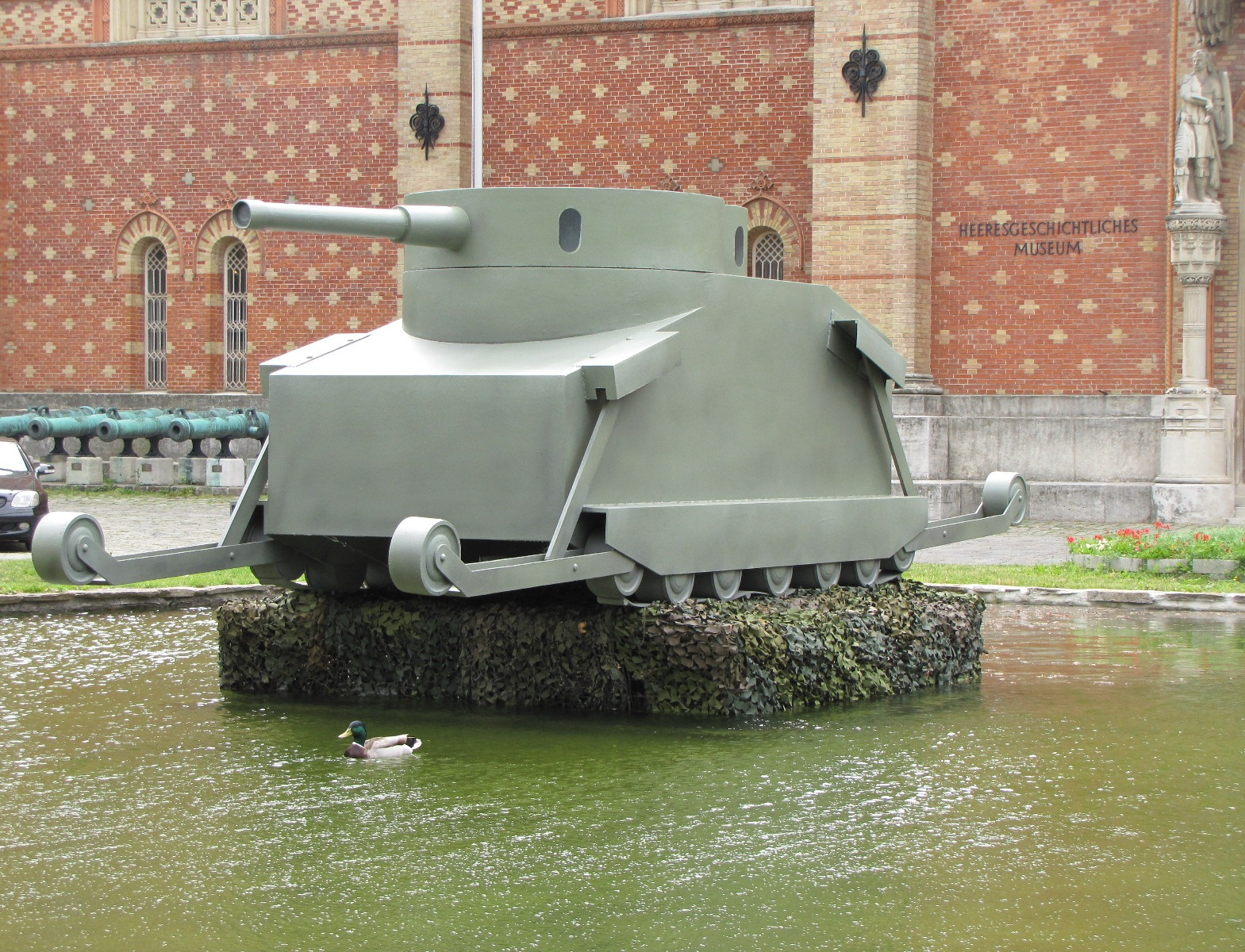
Model of the Motorgeschütz at the Austrian Museum of Military History

Gunther Adolf Burstyn (6 July 1879 in Bad Aussee, Steiermark – 15 April 1945 in Korneuburg, Lower Austria) was an inventor, technician, and officer of the Austro-Hungarian Army. He is best known for his Motorgeschütz, the first detailed concept of a modern tank.

== Personal life ==
Burstyn's father Adolf Burstyn came from a Jewish family in Lviv, but Burstyn converted to Catholicism along with his spouse Juliane (née Hoffman). Burstyn was initially named "Günther," but in later life chose to omit the umlaut and use the name "Gunther".

== Invention of the tank ==
In 1911, he produced and patented the first design of a cross-country fighting vehicle with swivelling gun turret (a tank), based on the gun turrets from naval warships and armoured vehicles using the then decade-old combustion engine. He called his tank the Motorgeschütz (literally "motor-gun"). His draft design, more advanced than some of the tank designs of World War I, was rejected both by Austria-Hungary and by the German Empire and no prototype was ever produced. He later sought to patent his design, but was told that it might infringe existing patents, so he dropped all plans to do so.

The vehicle would have been 3.5m long, 1.9m wide and 1.9m tall. It would have been armed with a light rapid firing cannon (30-40mm calibre) and possessed a road speed of 29 km/h and an off-road speed of 8 km/h. The vehicle would have been powered by a 60 hp truck engine. The four auxiliary wheels could be raised and lowered; the rear would be able to assist in traction while the front pair could be pivoted for steering. The vehicle was envisioned as being used to attack enemy machinegun nests and supporting infantry attacks, as well as attacking enemy artillery positions.

== World War II ==
At the beginning of World War II, Burstyn supported the NSDAP.

On March 31, 1941, Burstyn was able to personally present his tank innovations to Adolf Hitler. Burstyn was awarded the War Merit Cross, 1st and 2nd class, with Swords.

At the end of the war (April 1945), he died by suicide because he feared Soviet captivity.

== See also ==
- Lancelot de Mole
