= Ernest Swinton =

British Army general, author (1868–1951)

Major-General Sir Ernest Swinton KBE CB DSO
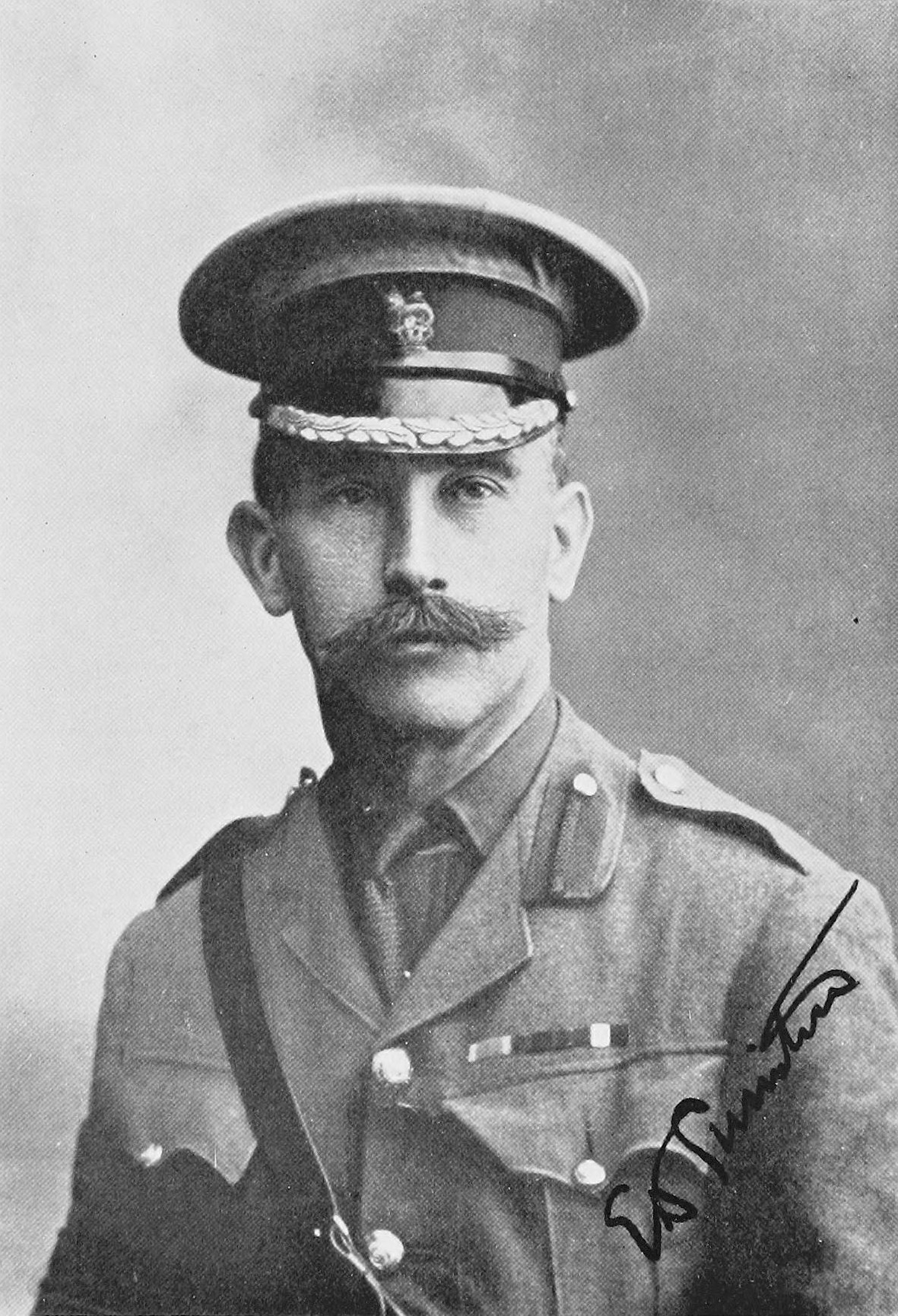
- Born: 21 October 1868; Bangalore, India
- Died: 15 January 1951 (aged 82); Oxford, Oxfordshire, England
- Military career
- Allegiance: United Kingdom
- Branch: Royal Engineers
- Service years: 1888–1919
- Rank: Major-General
- Conflicts: Second Boer War; First World War
- Awards: Knight Commander of the Order of the British Empire; Companion of the Order of the Bath; Distinguished Service Order
- Other work: Air Ministry; Citroën; Chichele Professor of Military History at Oxford University; Colonel Commandant of the Royal Tank Corps

Major-General Sir Ernest Dunlop Swinton, KBE, CB, DSO (21 October 1868 – 15 January 1951) was a British Army officer who played a part in the development and adoption of the tank during the First World War. He was also a war correspondent and author of several short stories on military themes. He is credited, along with fellow officer Lieutenant-Colonel Walter Dally Jones, with having initiated the use of the word "tank" as a code-name for the first British, tracked, armoured fighting vehicles.

== Early life and career ==
Swinton was born in Bangalore, India, in 1868. His father was a judge with the Madras Civil Service. The family returned to England in 1874, and Swinton was educated at University College School, Rugby School, Cheltenham College, Blackheath Proprietary School, and the Royal Military Academy, Woolwich. He was commissioned a second lieutenant in the Corps of Royal Engineers on 17 February 1888. Serving in India, he was promoted to lieutenant on 17 February 1891, and to captain on 17 February 1899.

He served as a captain during the Second Boer War (1899–1902), and returned home in September 1902, two months after the end of the war. For his service, he received the Distinguished Service Order (DSO) in the September 1901 South African Honours list (the order was dated 29 November 1900). Although principally concerned with railway construction, he took a keen interest in tactics, fortifications, and the effectiveness of modern weaponry, especially the recently introduced machine-gun. After the war, he wrote his book on small unit tactics, The Defence of Duffer's Drift, a military classic on minor tactics that has been used by the Canadian and British Armies to train their NCOs and officers, and by US military to train its officers. In the years leading up to the First World War, he served as a staff officer and as an official historian of the Russo-Japanese War. He was promoted to major in December 1906.

== First World War ==
The War Minister, Lord Kitchener, appointed Swinton as the official British war correspondent on the Western Front in 1914. Journalists were not allowed at the front, and Swinton's reports were censored and vetted before being passed to the press leading to an effectively uncontroversial although even-handed reporting. He was promoted to the temporary rank of lieutenant colonel in August 1914.

=== Development of tanks ===
Swinton recounts in his book Eyewitness how he first got the sudden idea to build a tank on 19 October 1914, while driving a car in France. It is known that in July 1914 he received a letter from a friend, a mining engineer named Hugh F. Marriott whom he had met while in South Africa. Marriott occasionally sent Swinton news of technical developments that might have a military application, and his letter described a machine he had seen in Antwerp, an American-made Holt Caterpillar Tractor. He suggested that the machine might be useful for transport, and Swinton passed the information on to several military and political figures who he thought might be interested. At the time, with no apparent prospect of war, the idea seemed to be a matter only of transport efficiency, and Swinton forgot about the matter. The idea of a caterpillar track as the basis for a fighting vehicle occurred to him only as he drove from St. Omer to Calais on the morning of October 1, 1914.

In Britain, David Roberts of Richard Hornsby & Sons had attempted starting in 1911 to interest British military officials in a tracked vehicle, but failed. Benjamin Holt of the Holt Manufacturing Company bought the patents related to the "chain track" track-type tractor from Richard Hornsby & Sons in 1914 for £4,000. When World War I broke out, with the problem of trench warfare and the difficulty of transporting supplies to the front, the pulling power of crawling-type tractors drew the attention of the military. The British War Office conducted trials with Holt tractors at Aldershot but saw them only as suitable for towing heavy artillery. Major Swinton was sent to France as an army war correspondent. In November 1914 he suggested to Sir Maurice Hankey, Secretary of the Committee of Imperial Defence, the construction of a bullet-proof, tracked vehicle that could destroy enemy machine guns.

In July 1915, Swinton was given a prominent post in the War Office and became aware of the Landship Committee, which was entirely under the control of the Admiralty; he formed a working friendship with its secretary, Albert Gerald Stern. Swinton was able to persuade the prime minister to call an inter-departmental conference on 28 August 1915, which ensured the army's cooperation with the Landship Committee's work and it was Swinton who drew up the specifications of the performance which the army would require.

In 1916 Swinton was promoted to lieutenant colonel and given responsibility for training the first tank units. He created the first tactical instructions for armoured warfare. The Royal Commission on Awards to Inventors decided after the war that the inventors of the tank were Sir William Tritton, managing director of Fosters and Major Walter Gordon Wilson; however, Swinton was awarded £1,000 for his contribution. By 1918, the War Office had received 2,100 Holt tractors.

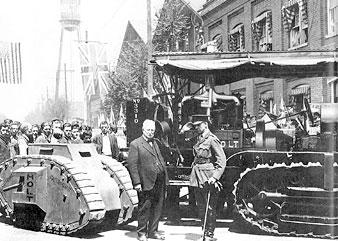
Swinton and Benjamin Holt in Stockton, California, on 22 April 1918, with a Holt caterpillar tractor (right) and a model of a British tank (left).

In April 1918, while on a tour of the US, Swinton visited Stockton, California, to publicly honour Benjamin Holt and the company for their contribution to the war effort and to relay Britain's gratitude to the inventor. Benjamin Holt was recognised by the general at a public meeting held in Stockton.

== Post-war ==
In 1919 Swinton retired as a major general. He subsequently served in the Civil Aviation department at the Air Ministry. He thereafter joined Citroën in 1922 as a director. He was Chichele Professor of Military History at the University of Oxford and a fellow of All Souls College, Oxford, from 1925 to 1939; he was also a Colonel Commandant of the Royal Tank Corps from 1934 to 1938. In 1938, he edited Twenty Years After: the Battlefields of 1914–18: then and Now, a publication of George Newnes Limited. This was planned for issue in 20 parts but ultimately amounted to 42. The magazine-style publication contained wartime and present-day (ca. 1938) images of France.

== Family life ==
Swinton married Grace Louise Clayton in 1897, and they had two sons and a daughter. Their daughter, Margaret Elizabeth, died in a road accident in 1944, aged 40, after being struck by an American Army vehicle while out cycling. A verdict of accidental death was returned at the inquest.

Swinton died in Oxford on 15 January 1951, aged 82.

== Honours and awards ==
- DSO : Companion of the Distinguished Service Order (DSO) – 29 November 1900 – in recognition of services during operations in South Africa.
- CB : Companion of the Order of the Bath (CB) – 12 February 1917 – in recognition of services during the war.
- KBE : Knight Commander of the Order of the British Empire – 2 June 1923 – in the King's Birthday Honours.
- (France) Croix de Chevalier of the Legion of Honour – 1916 – in recognition of distinguished service during the campaign

== Works ==
- Eyewitness : Being Personal Reminiscences of Certain Phases of the Great War, Including the Genesis of the Tank (London: Hodder and Stoughton, 1932)

== See also ==
- Clan Swinton

== Bibliography ==
- Swinton, Ernest (under the pseudonym "Lieutenant Backsight Forethought"), The Defence of Duffer's Drift, Oxford: United Service Magazine, 1905; Originally published in April 1905 in "The British Infantry Journal", .
- Swinton, Ernest (as editor), The Truth About Port Arthur, London: Murray, 1908
- Swinton, Ernest (as editor), The Russian Army and the Japanese War, Vol. I, New York: Dutton, 1909
- Swinton, Ernest (as editor), The Russian Army and the Japanese War, Vol. II, New York: Dutton, 1909
- McClure's Magazine (two articles under the pseudonym "Ole Luk-Oie"), Link, 1910
- Swinton, Ernest (under the pseudonym "Ole Luk-Oie"), The Green Curve, New York: Doubleday, 1914, and as an added bonus, his obituary.
- Swinton, Ernest (under the pseudonym "Ole Luk-Oie"), The Great Tab Dope, Edinburgh: Blackwood, 1916
- Swinton, Ernest, Tanks, 1918, reprinted from "The Strand Magazine".
- The Study of War (1926)
- Swinton, Major-General Sir Ernest D., Eyewitness, London: Hodder & Stoughton, 1932 (includes the genesis of the tank)
- Over My Shoulder (1951, posthumously)

also:

- (translation) An Eastern Odyssey: The Third Expedition of Haardt and Audion-Dubreuil (1935)
