= Tanks of the United States =

Evolution of American Tanks

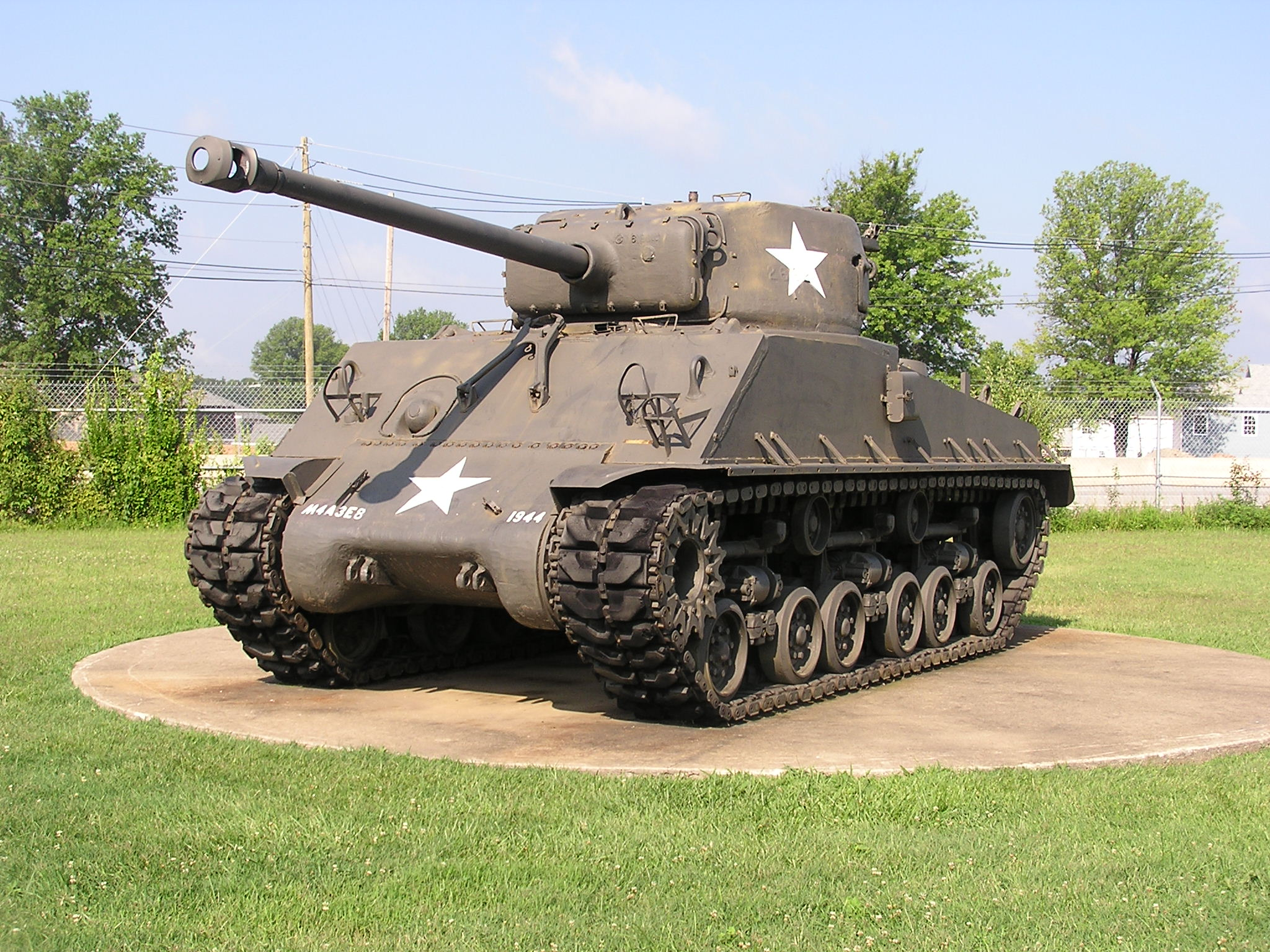
The M4A3(76)W HVSS (M4A3E8) variant of the M4 Sherman tank embodied improvements made throughout production in light of experience.

The United States has produced tanks since their inception in World War I, up until the present day. While there were several American experiments in tank design, the first American tanks to see service were copies of French light tanks and a joint heavy tank design with the United Kingdom.

In the interwar period there was reduced development due to the low expenditure on war material following the US non-interventionist policy and the financial position.

In World War II, the US came to the fore with tanks designed for mass production and reliability reflecting the US position as the "arsenal of democracy".

The U.S. has been greatly influential in the design philosophy, production and doctrine of tanks, and has been responsible for some of the most successful tank designs.

== World War I ==
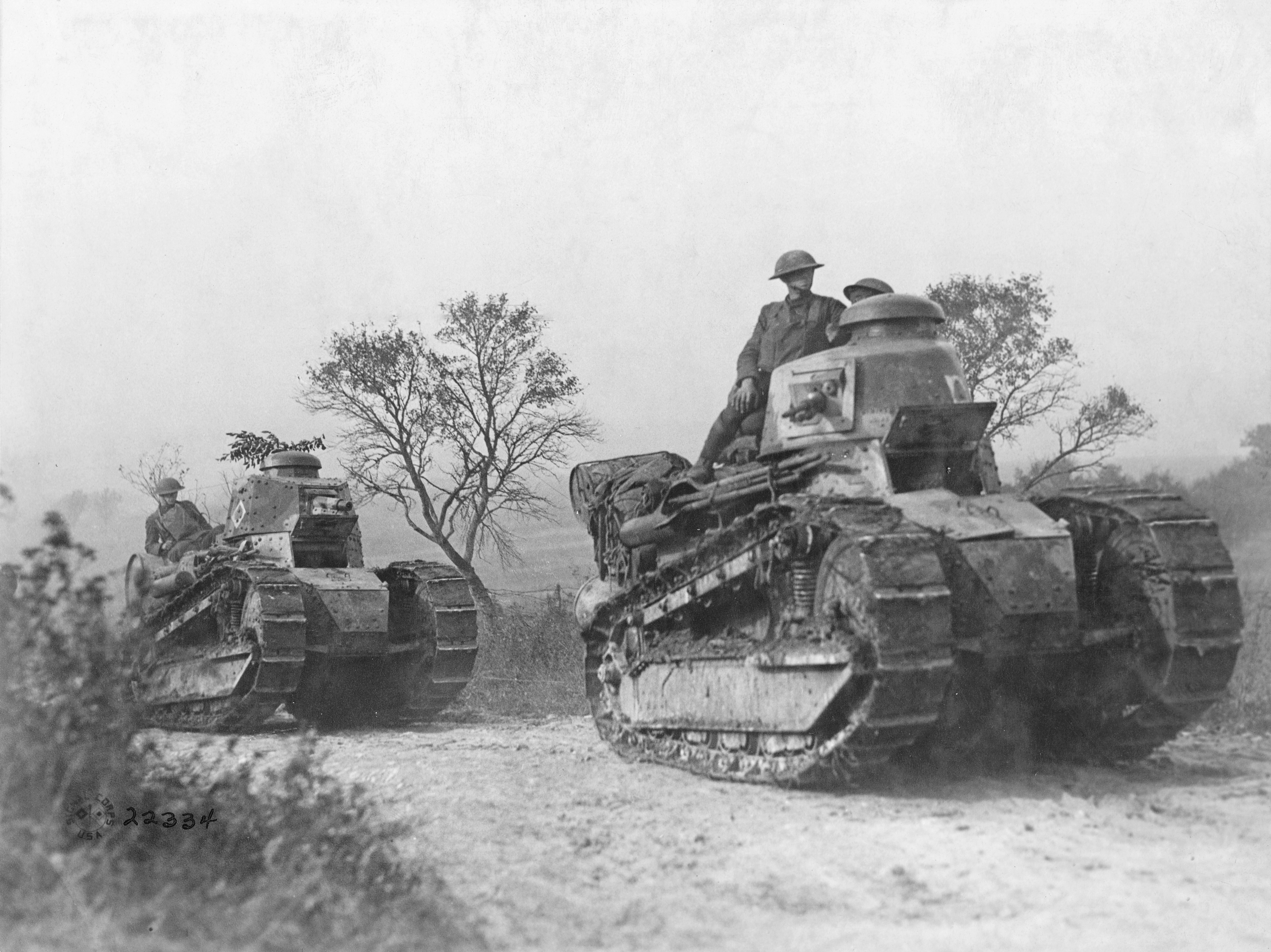
Renault FT tanks being operated by the US Army in France. Light tanks with a crew of only two were mass-produced during World War I.

The U.S. entered the First World War on the side of the Entente Powers in April 1917, without any tanks of its own. The following month, in light of a report into British and French theories on tank operation, the American Expeditionary Forces' commander-in-chief, General John Pershing, decided that both light and heavy tanks should be produced. A joint Anglo-French-American program was launched to develop a new heavy tank based on British heavy tank designs, though it was expected that sufficient quantities of tanks would not be available until April 1918. The Inter-Allied Tank Commission decided that, because of the wartime demands on French industry, the quickest way to supply the American forces with tanks was to manufacture the French Renault FT light tank in the United States. Some heavy tanks and light tanks would also be supplied by the British.

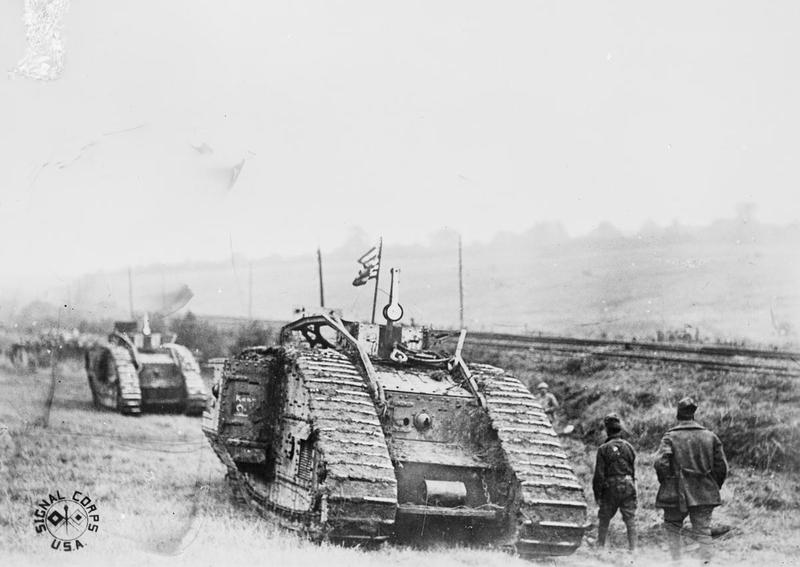
301st Tank Battalion going into action with Mark V tanks at Saint-Souplet, France in October 1918 (Battle of the Selle)

Captain Dwight Eisenhower had gone to Camp Meade, Maryland, in February 1918 with the 65th Engineer Regiment, which had been activated to provide the organizational basis for the creation of the Army's first heavy tank battalion. In March, the 1st Battalion, Heavy Tank Service (as it was then known) was ordered to prepare for movement overseas, and Eisenhower went to New York with the advance party to work out the details of embarkation and shipment with port authorities. The battalion shipped out on the night of 26 March, however Eisenhower did not join them. He had performed well as an administrator, and upon his return to Camp Meade, he was told he would be staying in the United States, where his talent for logistics would be put to use in establishing the Army's primary tank training center at Camp Colt in Gettysburg, Pennsylvania. Eisenhower became the #3 leader of the new tank corps and rose to the temporary rank of lieutenant colonel in the National Army and trained tank crews at "Camp Colt"–his first command–on the grounds of "Pickett's Charge" on the American Civil War battle site. The American Army in France had Captain George S. Patton as the first officer assigned to train the crews. While tanks like the Mark V and FT were being shipped over from France and Britain for training, Eisenhower trained his units with trucks that had bolted down machine guns. Once the tanks arrived Eisenhower had to learn how to operate one first before letting his men use it.

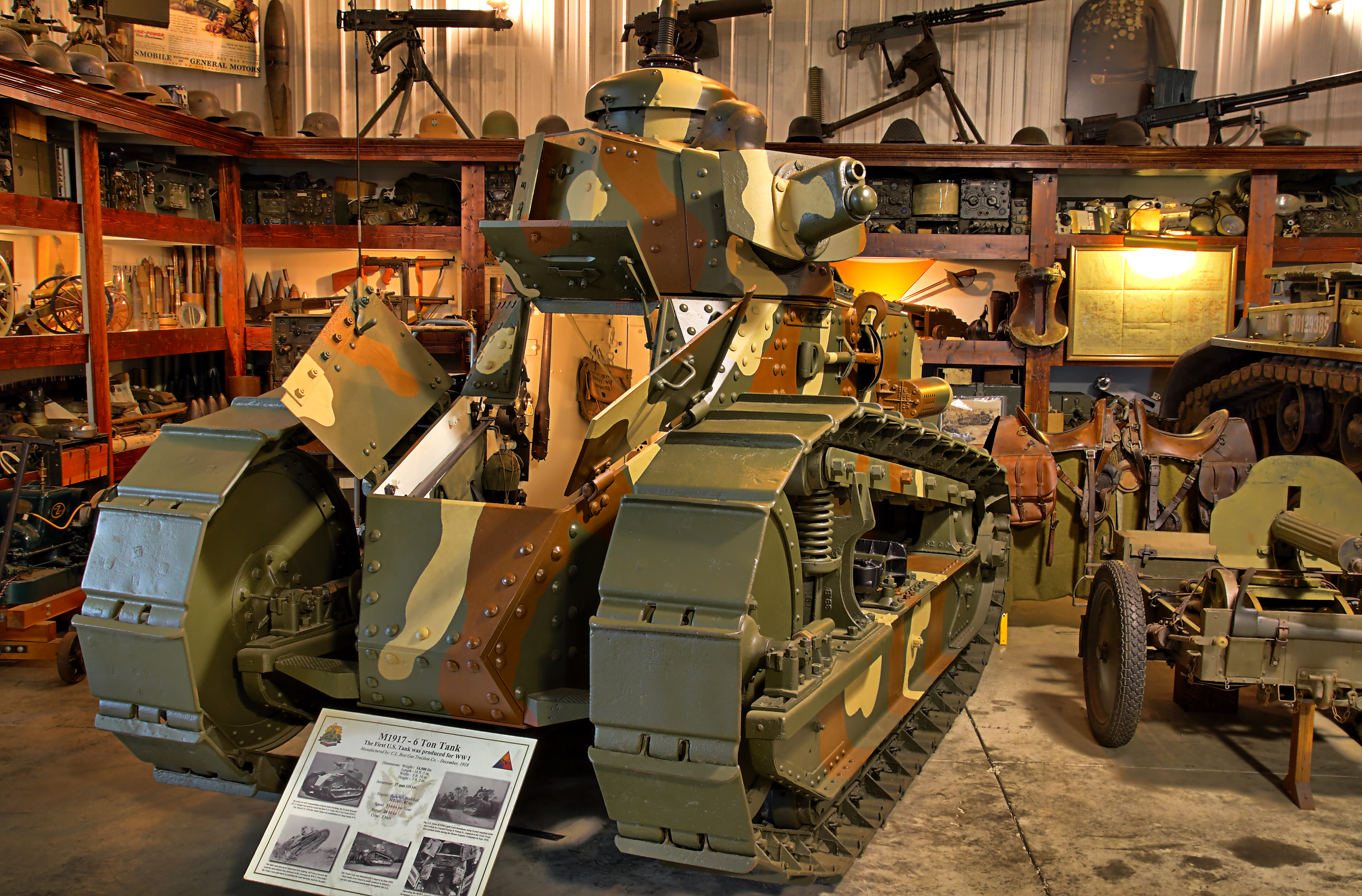
US M1917 light tank

The Six Ton Tank M1917 was the U.S.'s first mass-produced tank, a license-built near-copy of the French Renault FT. The U.S. Army ordered approximately 4,440 M1917s between 1918 and 1919, receiving about 950 before canceling the contract. The initial requirement of 1,200 was decided upon then later increased to 4,400, and some sample Renault tanks, plans, and various parts were sent to the US for study. The design was to be carried out by the Ordnance Department, under the job title "Six-ton Special Tractor", and orders for the vehicles placed with private manufacturers. However, the project was beset by problems: the French specifications were in metric, and thus incompatible with American machinery; coordination between military departments, suppliers, and manufacturers was poor; bureaucratic inertia, lack of cooperation from military departments, and possible vested interests all delayed progress.

The Army in France was expecting the first 300 M1917s by April 1918, but by June, production had yet to begin, which forced the US to acquire 144 Renault FTs from the French. Production of the M1917 did not begin until the autumn, and the first completed vehicles emerged in October. Two arrived in France on 20 November, nine days after the armistice with Germany, and a further eight in December.

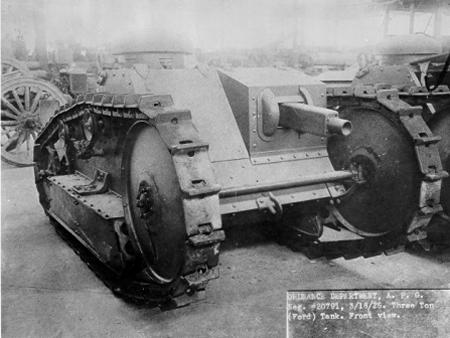
US Ford 3-Ton M1918

The Ford 3-Ton M1918 was one of the first light tank designs by the U.S. It was a small two-man, one-gun tank, armed with an .30 M1919 Browning machine gun and capable of a maximum speed of 8 mph (13 km/h). Design on the 3-ton tank started in mid-1918. The 3-Ton was a two-man tank designed so that American forces could use another tank besides the Renault FT. Its twin Model T Ford engines were controlled by the driver (seated at the front), while the gunner sat beside him and controlled a .30-06 machine gun (either the M1917 Marlin or M1919 Browning) on a limited-traverse mount.

A contract for 15,000 of these vehicles was awarded; however, the U.S. Tank Corps felt that the design did not meet their requirements. The contract for the 15,000 tanks was ended after the Armistice, when only fifteen had been produced.

== Post-World War I ==
After the end of the conflict, the U.S. Army was reorganized. In 1919, Pershing recommended to a joint session of the Senate and House Committee on Military Affairs that the tank be subordinated to the infantry. As a result, the 1920 National Defense Act disbanded the U.S. Tank Corps, and reassigned its tanks to the infantry branch, with only two heavy tank battalions and four light tank battalions escaping post-war demobilization.

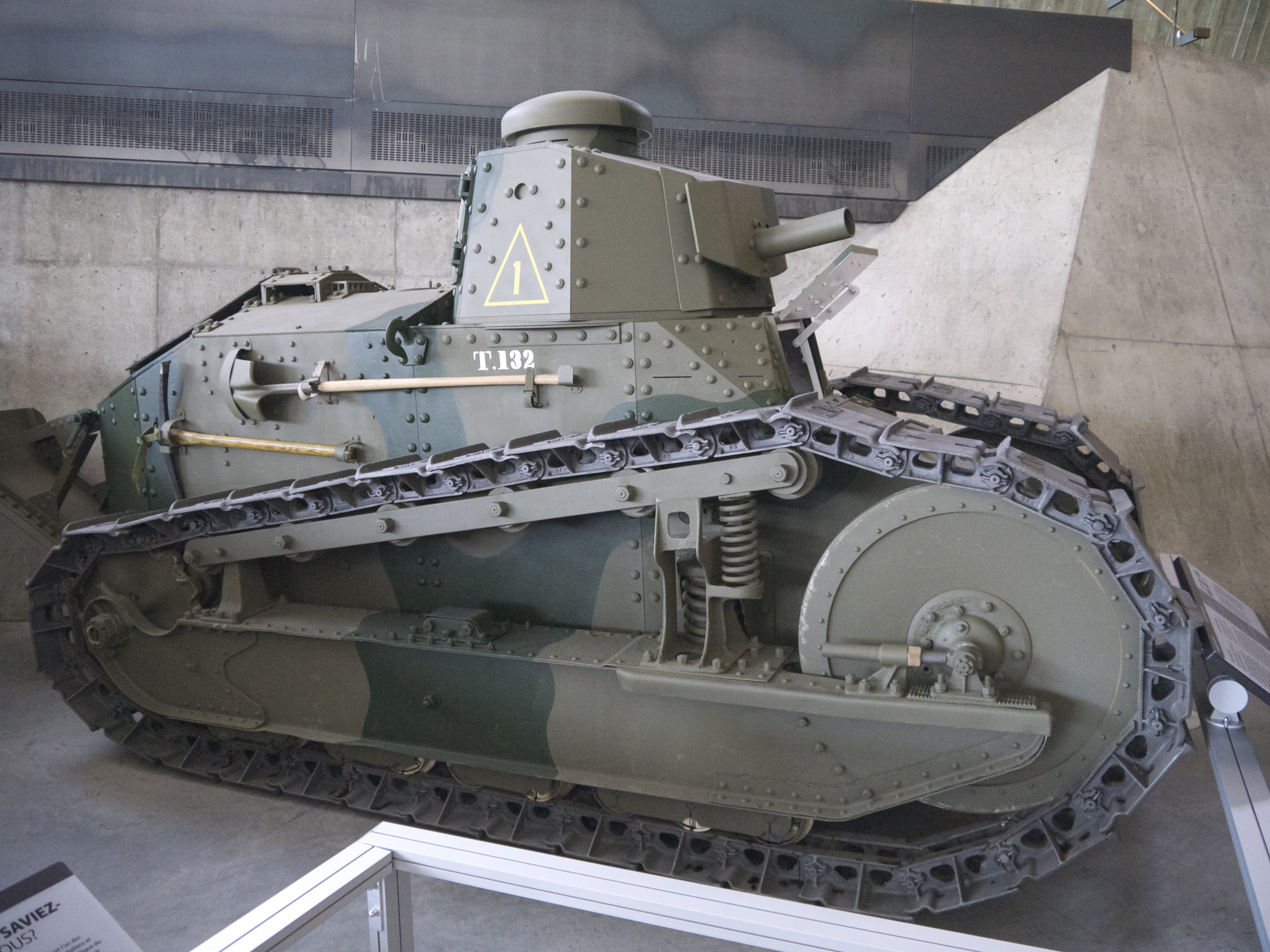
M1917 tank at the Canadian War Museum

The M1917 tanks came too late, and did not take part in any combat during the war. Afterwards, however, five accompanied the U.S. Marine Expeditionary Force to Tianjin in April 1927 under General Smedley Butler. They returned to the U.S. in late 1928. After the Tank Corps was abolished as a separate branch, and control of tanks handed to the infantry, the number of tank units was progressively reduced, and the vehicles mothballed or scrapped.

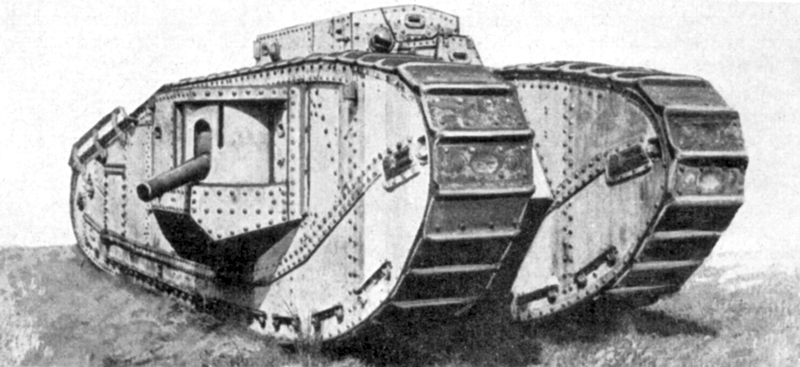
A Mark VIII or Liberty tank.

The Tank Mark VIII (or "Liberty", after its engine) was an Anglo-American tank design of the First World War, a collaborative effort to equip France, the U.K., and the U.S. with a single heavy tank design built in France for an offensive in 1919. Testing of the design was not finished until after the war, and it was decided to build 100 vehicles in the U.S.; these were constructed in 1919 and 1920. The American Liberty tanks equipped a single unit: the 67th Infantry (Tank) Regiment, based in Aberdeen, Maryland. The curious designation of the unit had its origin in the fact that since 1922 by law all tanks had to be part of the Infantry. Some Liberty tanks were assigned to the 301st Tank Battalion (Heavy), later redesignated the 17th Tank Battalion (Heavy). Throughout most of 1921 and 1922, Major Dwight D. Eisenhower commanded this unit.

Although the tank of World War I was slow, clumsy, difficult to control, and mechanically unreliable, its value as a weapon had been clearly demonstrated. In addition to the light and heavy categories of American-produced tanks of World War I, a third classification, the medium, began receiving attention in 1919. The meaning of the terms light, medium, and heavy tanks changed between the wars. During World War I and immediately thereafter, the light tank was considered to be up to 10 tons, the medium (produced by the British) was roughly between 10 and 25 tons, and the heavy was over 25 tons. Later, during World War II, increased weights resulted in light tank designs often weighing over 20 tons, medium tank designs weighing over 30 tons, and heavy tank designs weighing over 60 tons.

Patton and Eisenhower remained involved in developing the armored arm, which found a temporary home at Camp Meade under Rockenbach's command. In particular, the two men formulated theory and doctrine for the use of tanks in mass formations to achieve breakthroughs and carry out flanking attacks. They were met with vigorous opposition to their ideas from senior army officers, who favored the use of armor to support the infantry, not as a separate arm conducting independent operations. Congress took this view as well, when enacting the 1920 legislation that dissolved the Tank Corps as a separate entity.

The National Defense Act of 1920 placed the Tank Corps under the Infantry. Patton had argued for an independent Tank Corps, and understood that tanks operating with Cavalry would stress mobility, while tanks tied to the Infantry would emphasize firepower. However, the supply of slow World War I tanks and the subordination of tanks to the infantry branch impeded the development of any role other than direct infantry support, so the United States moved slowly in the development of armored and mechanized forces, which resulted in a significant cut in funding for tank research and development. Patton, convinced there was no future in tanks, applied and received a transfer to the cavalry in September 1920. Eisenhower got out two years later, in January 1922, when he was assigned to the staff of an infantry brigade in Panama.

The U.S. War Department considered that two types of tanks, the light and the medium, should fulfill all missions. The light tank was to be transportable by truck, and not exceed 5 tons gross weight. The medium tank was not to exceed 15 tons, so as to bring it within the weight capacity of railroad flatcars. Although an experimental 15-ton tank, the M1924, reached the mock-up stage, this and other attempts to satisfy the War Department and infantry specifications proved to be unsatisfactory. In reality, it was simply impossible to build a 15-ton vehicle meeting both War Department and infantry requirements.

In 1926, the General Staff reluctantly consented to the development of a 23-ton tank, although it made clear that efforts were to continue toward the production of a satisfactory 15-ton vehicle. The infantry were in agreement that a light tank, transportable by truck, best met their requirements. The net effect of the infantry's preoccupation with light tanks, and the limited funds available for tank development in general, was to slow the development of heavier vehicles and, ultimately, to contribute to the serious shortage of medium tanks at the outbreak of World War II.

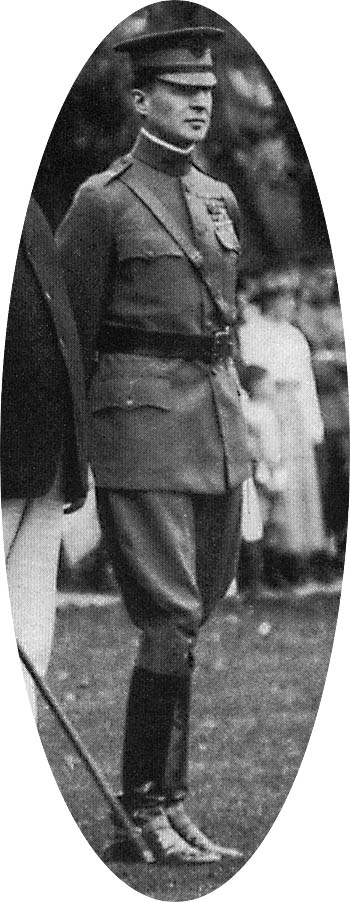
Douglas MacArthur at West Point as superintendent

The real beginning of the Armored Force was in 1928, twelve years before it was officially established, when Secretary of War Dwight F. Davis directed that a tank force be developed in the Army, after observing the maneuvers by the British Experimental Armoured Force. Davis' 1928 directive for the development of a tank force resulted in the assembly and encampment of an experimental mechanized force at Camp Meade, Maryland, from 1 July to 20 September 1928. The combined arms team consisted of elements furnished by Infantry (including tanks), Cavalry, Field Artillery, the Air Corps, Engineer Corps, Ordnance Department, Chemical Warfare Service, and Medical Corps. An effort to continue the experiment in 1929 was defeated by insufficient funds and obsolete equipment, but the 1928 exercise did bear fruit, as the War Department Mechanization Board, appointed to study results of the experiment, recommended the permanent establishment of a mechanized force.

Despite inadequate funding, the Ordnance Department managed to develop several experimental light and medium tanks, and also worked with auto engineer J. Walter Christie to test a Christie design model by 1929. None of these tanks were accepted, usually because each of them exceeded standards set by other Army branches. Patton later worked closely with Christie to improve the silhouette, suspension, power, and armament of the tanks. Christie's ideas had a great impact upon tank tactics and unit organization in many countries and, finally, upon the U.S. Army as well.

On 21 November 1930, Douglas MacArthur had been made chief of staff, with the rank of general. As chief of staff from 1930 to 1935, MacArthur wanted to advance motorization and mechanization throughout the Army. In late 1931 all arms and services were directed to adopt mechanization and motorization, and were permitted to conduct research and experiment as necessary. The Cavalry was given the task of developing combat vehicles that would enhance its role of reconnaissance, counter-reconnaissance, flank action, and pursuit.

With the law passed, tanks belonged to the infantry branch, so the cavalry gradually bought a group of combat cars, lightly armored and armed tanks that were often indistinguishable from the newer infantry "tanks". In 1933, MacArthur set the stage for the complete mechanization of the cavalry, declaring "The horse has no higher degree of mobility today than he had a thousand years ago. The time has therefore arrived when the Cavalry arm must either replace or assist the horse as a means of transportation, or else pass into the limbo of discarded military formations."

In November 1936, the U.S. Army's cavalry branch decided to modernize and needed a fully armored vehicle, capable of keeping up with the cavalry and of fulfilling regular combat duties. It came up with the T7 Combat Car, designed and built at the Rock Island Arsenal between 1937 and 1938, which was based on the M1 Combat Car but with an extended chassis and a convertible suspension - the ability to travel using wheels or tracks. The only prototype T7 Combat Car (No. W40223) was shipped to Aberdeen Proving Grounds in August 1938 for testing. While it showed good speed and performance, cavalry branch representatives were not impressed. Tests were delayed until 1939, but they were reasonably successful. The vehicle even participated in the First Army maneuvers at Plattsburgh, New York, in 1939, where the cavalrymen liked it. However, in October 1939, the cavalry branch formed new requirements for their combat vehicles which specified regular tracked (not combined) suspension. The reason for that decision was that the tracks were already available in reasonable quantity and quality and thus there was no need for the complexity and higher cost associated with convertible vehicles.[2] Furthermore, the heavy M2 Browning machine gun it was equipped with was determined insufficient for the role. The ongoing war in Europe at the time proved that, in order for a vehicle to be successful, it needed a proper cannon. In October 1939, despite its potential, the Mechanized Cavalry Board recommended further development and test of the T7 Combat Car program, and all other such convertible vehicles, be canceled, marking the end of wheel-tracked combat vehicle development for the U.S. Army.

== Interwar ==
=== M1 combat car and M2 light tank ===
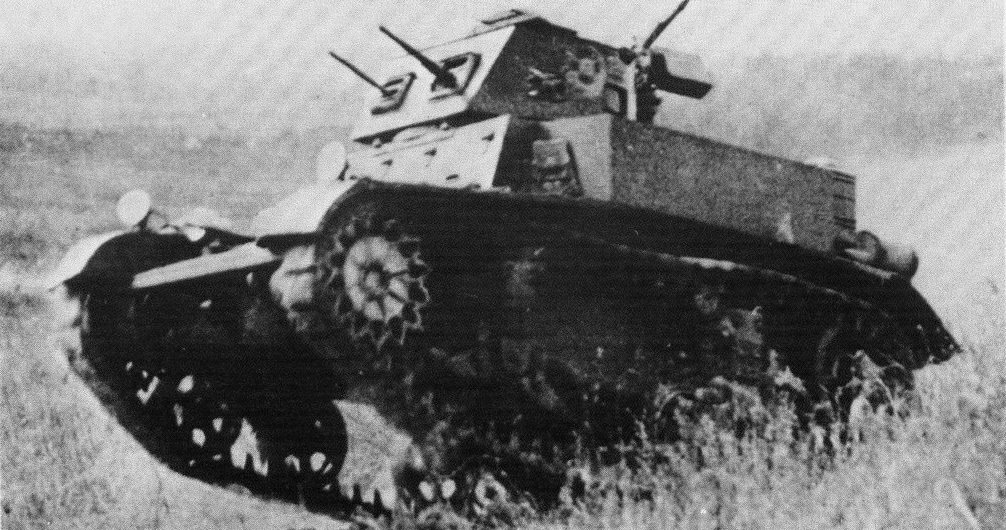
An M1 combat car, later designated as the M1A2 light tank

The M1 combat car was a tankette that entered use with the U.S. Cavalry in the late 1930s. Under the terms of the Defense Act of 1920, tanks were restricted to infantry units, which were equipped with M1 tanks armed with twin machine gun turrets by 1935. To allow U.S. Army cavalry units to be equipped with armored fighting vehicles, the tanks developed for the cavalry were designated "combat cars". The cavalry branch opted for a single, larger turret to be mounted on their M1s. Other upgrades included improved suspension, improved transmission, and better engine cooling. The combat car designation was dropped in 1940, and the vehicle was renamed as the light tank M1A2.

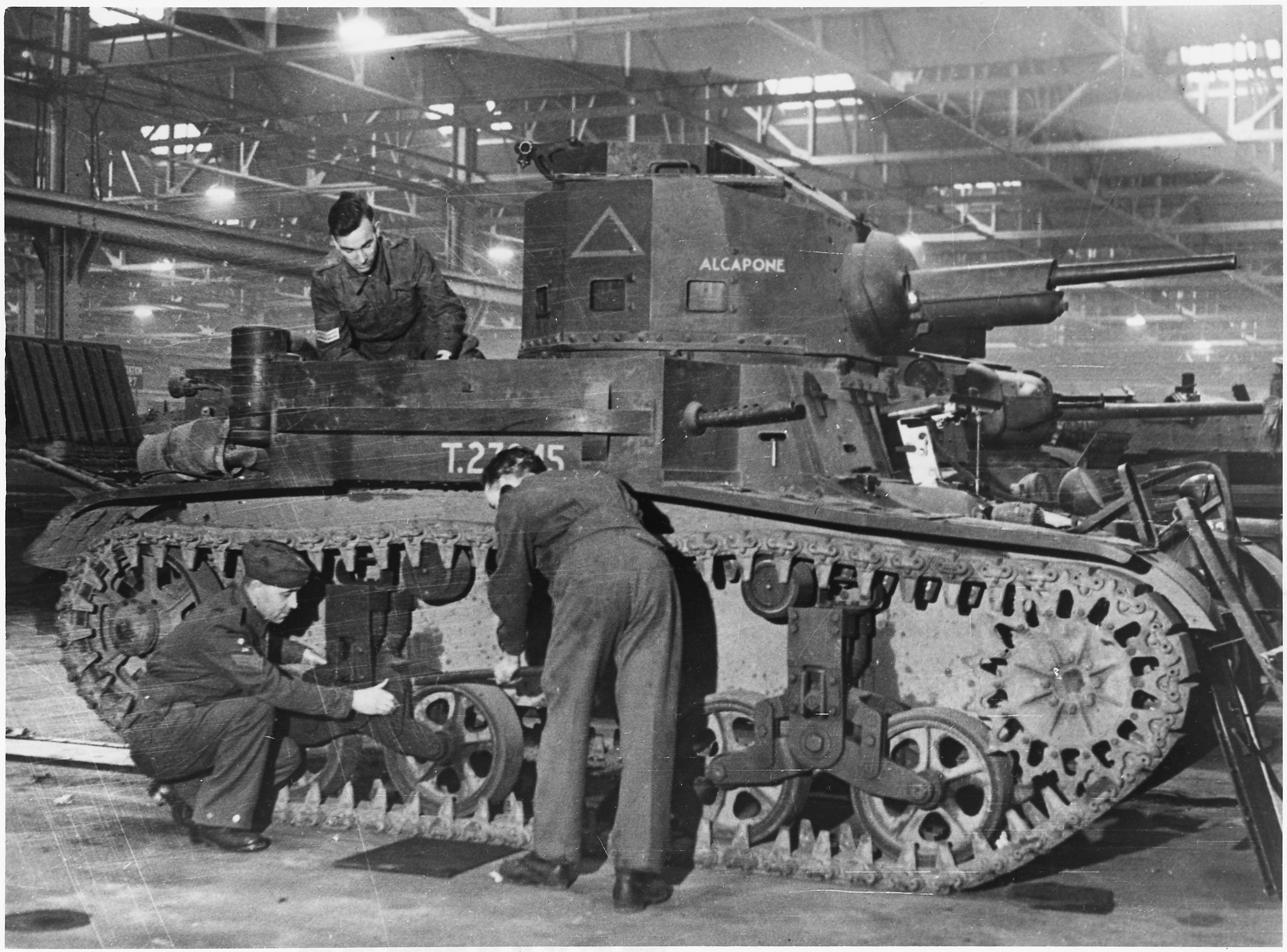
An M2A4 light tank.

The next tank to be designed, the M2 light tank, was developed in 1935 by Rock Island Arsenal for the infantry branch of the U.S. Army. The design originated from the earlier T1 and 1929 T2 Medium Tank designs, and drew limited inspiration from the British Vickers 6-ton. Its main weapon was one .50 BMG M2 Browning machine gun, and one .30-06 M1919 Browning machine gun, both installed in a small, one-man turret. After only 10 units were delivered, the Infantry branch decided to switch to a twin turret configuration, with the M1919 moved to a second turret. These early twin-turret tanks were nicknamed "Mae West" by the troops, after the popular movie star. The twin-turret layout was inefficient, but was a common feature of 1930s light tanks derived from the Vickers, such as the Soviet T-26 and Polish 7TP.

An improved version of the M2 light tank, the M2A4, armed with a high-velocity 37 mm gun M3 and coaxial machine gun in a single turret, served with the Marines' 1st Tank Battalion on Guadalcanal in 1942–43. The M2A4 was the only model of the M2 line to see combat. The Rock Island Arsenal also started work on a new medium tank, based on the design of the M2 Light Tank. Initially designated the T5, the redesigned model (with a 350 hp R-975 radial engine) was redesignated as the M2 Medium Tank in June 1939.

=== T1 light tank and T2 medium tank ===
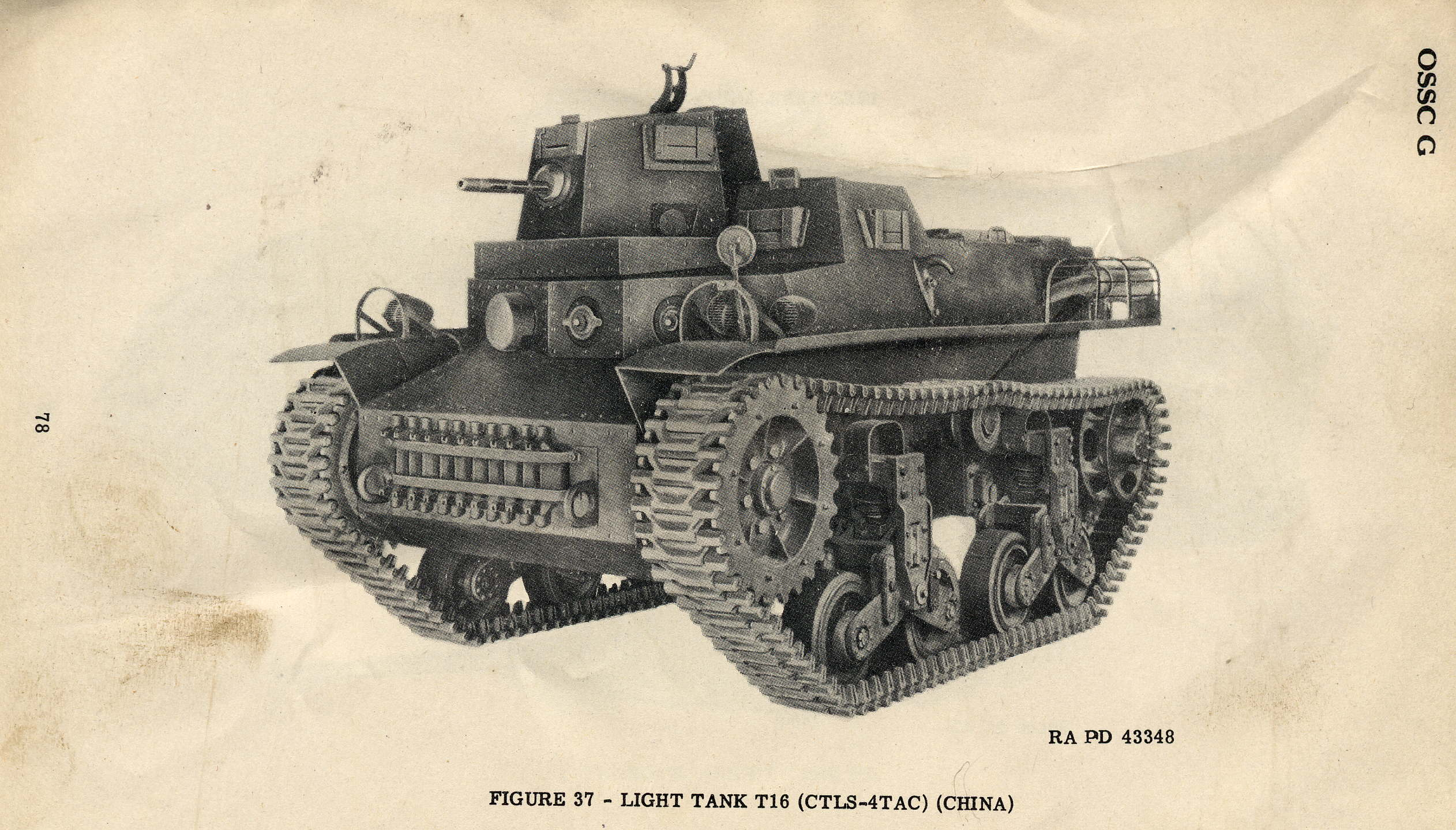
T16 light tank

The T1 light tank and T2 medium tank were prototypes that were designed in the 1920s but soon became obsolete, although they would help development with later tanks.

=== Marmon Herrington light tanks ===
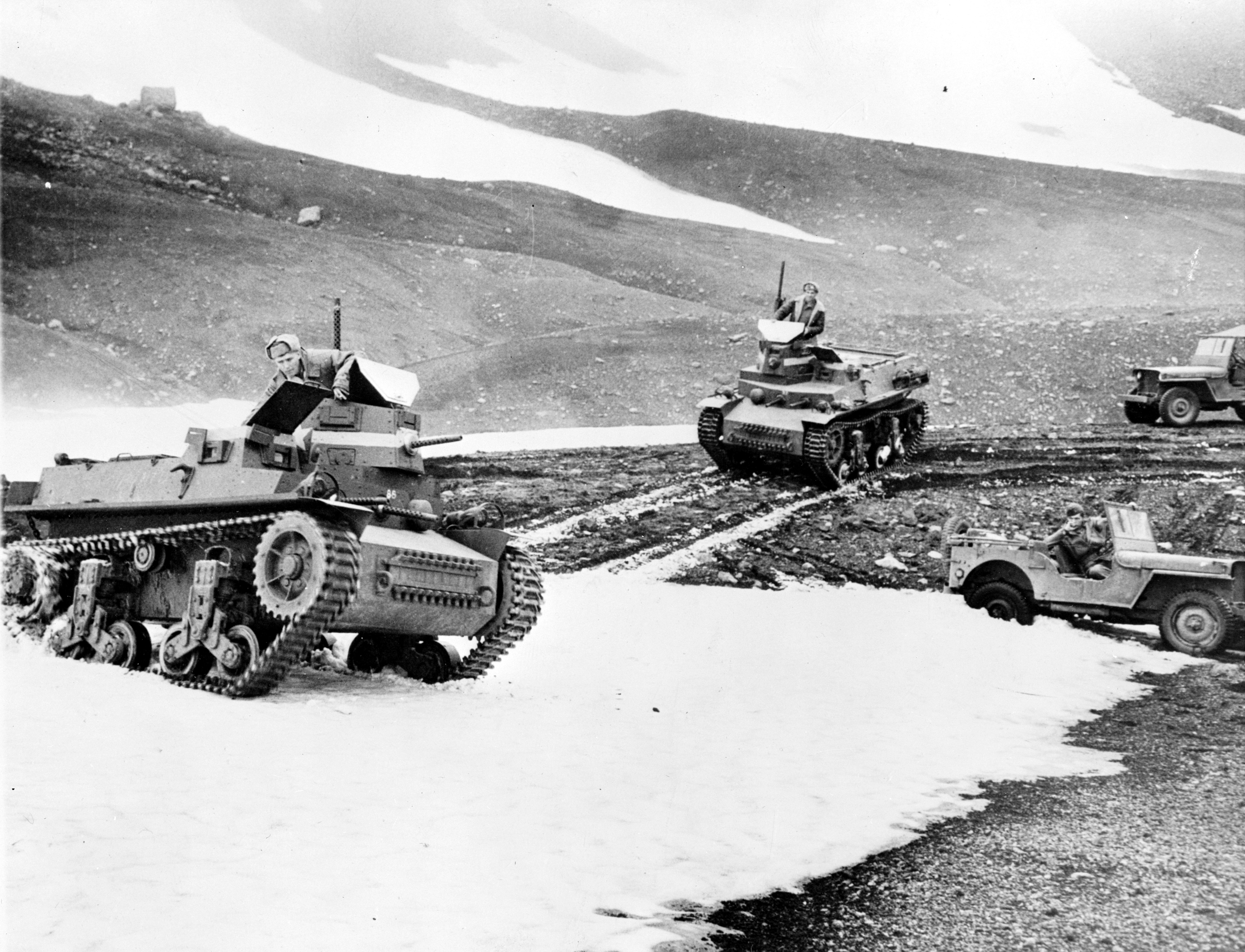
Marmon-Herrington CTLS tanks (a CTLS-4TAC in the foreground and a CTLS-4TAY in the background) in Alaska, summer of 1942

The Marmon-Herrington combat tank light (CTL) was a US light tank produced for the export market at the start of the Second World War. The CTL-3 had a crew of two and was armed with three M1919 Browning machine guns.

A few saw combat in the Dutch East Indies campaign against the Japanese invasion.

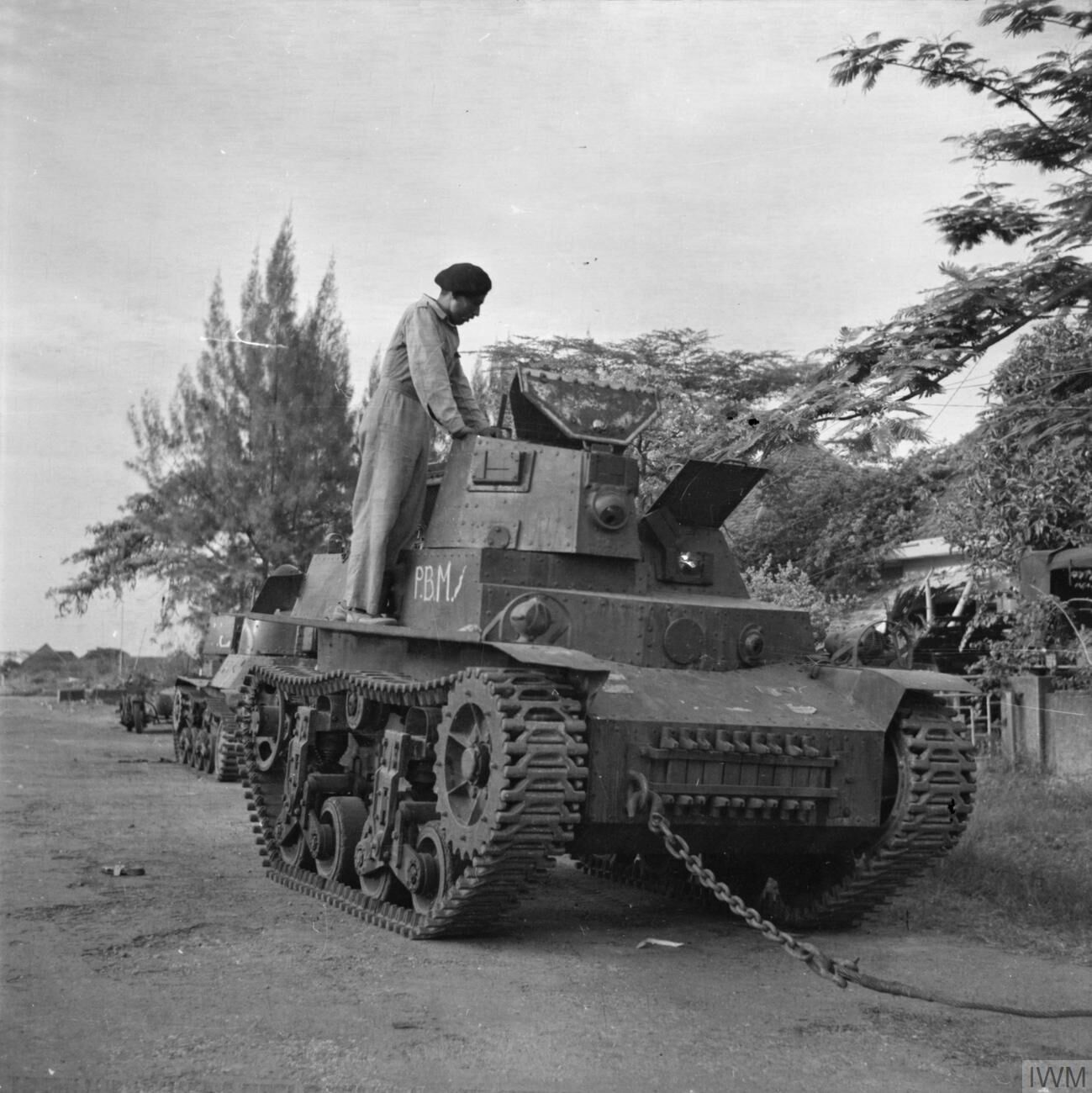
Marmon-Herrington CTLS in Surabaya, 1945.

In mid-1942 a batch was diverted to Australia from the Dutch order where they were used for training

After the attack on Pearl Harbor, some of these tanks were taken over by the United States Army and employed in Northern Alaska as the T14 and T16 respectively. There were also sent to Chinese Nationalist forces fighting the Japanese as more than 600 of the T16 CTMS tanks were delivered to China under Lend-Lease after Pearl Harbor.

=== M2 medium tank ===
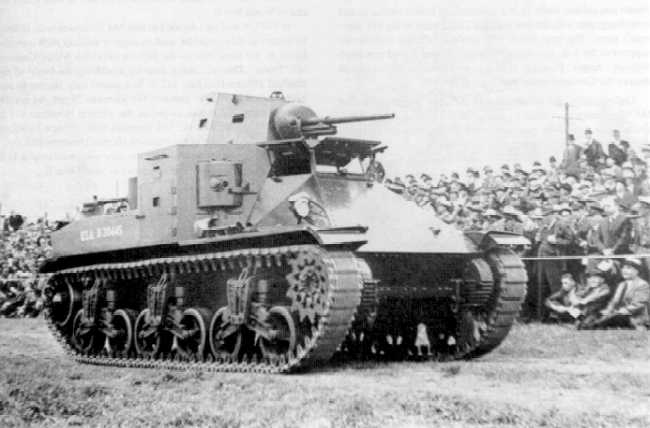
An M2A1 medium tank (late production series)

The M2 medium tank was a larger development of the M2 light tank and was first produced in 1939 by the Rock Island Arsenal, just prior to the war in Europe. Many components were common or used a similar design to the Light M2, including the vertical volute spring suspension which would be used in later tanks as well. Twin-wheeled bogies were mounted externally, and rubber-bushed and rubber-shoed track proved durable on roads. The initial M2 model was powered by an air-cooled Wright R-975 radial engine. For the M2A1, this engine was supercharged to provide an extra 50 hp (37 kW) for a total of 400 horsepower (300 kW), and designated as the R-975 C1 radial engine. The M2 Medium Tank's unique features included a total of 7 M1919 Browning machine guns, whereas most tanks only had 1 or 2, bullet deflector plates, and sloped armor on the hull front (glacis plate). The main armament was a 37 mm gun, with 32 mm armor; the M2A1 had a 51 mm gun mantlet. The features of the M2 series development, both good and bad, provided many lessons for U.S. tank designers that were later applied with great success in the M3 Lee, M4 Sherman and many other armored fighting vehicles.

Production for the M2 medium tanks was 18 M2 tanks, and 94 M2A1 tanks, for a total of 112. For combat it was a poor design, with thin armor, inadequate main armament and a high-profile. The four sponson-mounted machine guns proved to be completely unnecessary. But it provided important lessons that were used for the later M3 and M4 medium tanks. In particular, the M2's sloped frontal hull armor (glacis plate) was extremely advanced for a 1939 design, and would become a permanent feature of U.S. tank design. Events in Western Europe and on the Eastern Front rapidly demonstrated that the M2 was obsolete, and it was never used overseas in combat; it was used for training purposes throughout the war.

Chrysler opened a new tank plant, the Detroit Arsenal Tank Plant, to manufacture the M2, and the US Government contracted in August 1940 for 1,000 vehicles to be produced. As events in Europe made obvious that the M2 was obsolete, the government modified the contract before production began. Instead of M2 medium tanks, the plant would now build 1,000 M3 Grant tanks. Production of the M2 was returned to the Rock Island Arsenal, where 94 M2A1s were eventually built. The M2A1 had slightly better armor and a slightly larger turret than the original M2, since it had the turret from the M3 Light Tank, with gun mantlet armor 2 inches (51 mm) thick.

== World War II ==
=== Light tanks ===
==== M3 light tank and M5 light tank ====
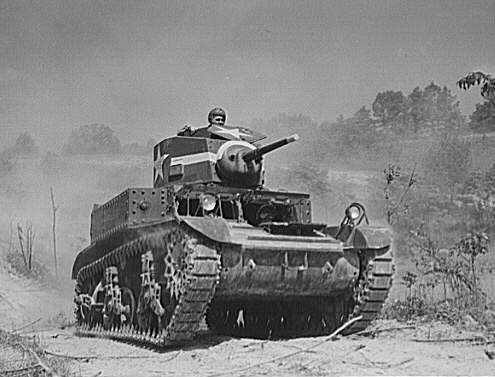
M3 Stuart at Fort Knox, Kentucky, used for training

The M3 light tank was an upgrade of the M2 light tank. The Battle of France gave momentum to the US tank program because U.S. observers saw how easily British and French light tanks were decimated by the advanced German Panzers, and in July 1940 work began on a new light tank based on the M2 series.

The initial upgrade was designated the M3 light tank, and it was given thicker armor, modified suspension and a 37 mm gun. Production of the M3 and later the M5 Stuart started in March 1941 and continued until October 1943 with a total of 25,000 produced.

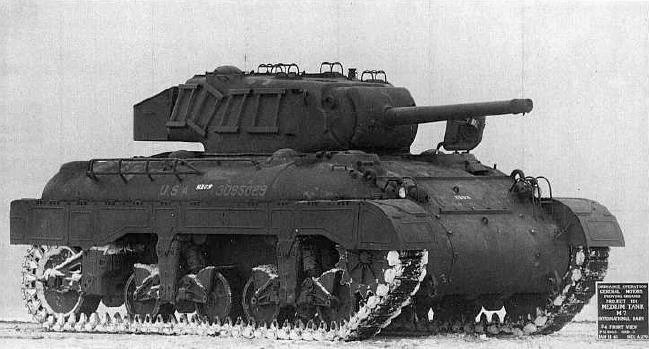
The M7 light tank design intended to replace the Stuart tanks became overweight in development and was rejected.

An upgrade of the M3, which was initially called M4 but later redesignated the M5, was developed with improved engines and produced in 1942. The M5 featured a redesigned hull and driver's hatches moved to the top. There was the T7 light tank project with thicker armor, volute suspension and better gun. Changes requested in development took the weight of the T7 out of the "light tank" class and it was reclassified as a medium tank and accepted for production with a contract for 3,000. However the M4 was already in production and the M7 was canceled with only 7 completed. The M5 gradually replaced the M3 in production from 1942 and was in turn succeeded by the Light Tank M24 in 1944.

The British Army was the first to use the M3 in combat. In November 1941, some 170 Stuarts took part in Operation Crusader, with poor results.

Although the high losses suffered by Stuart-equipped units during the operation had more to do with better tactics and training of the enemy than superiority of enemy tanks in the North African campaign, the operation revealed that the M3 had several technical faults. Mentioned in the British complaints were the 37 mm gun's limited range and poor internal layout. The two-man turret crew was a significant weakness, and some British units tried to fight with three-man turret crews. Crews liked the vehicle's high speed and mechanical reliability.

From the summer of 1942, when enough U.S. medium tanks had been received, the British usually kept Stuarts out of tank-to-tank combat. M3s, M3A3s, and M5s continued in British service until the end of the war, but British armor units had a smaller proportion of these light tanks than US units. The National Revolutionary Army also received the M3A3s tanks and some were later used in the fight against the Communist forces.

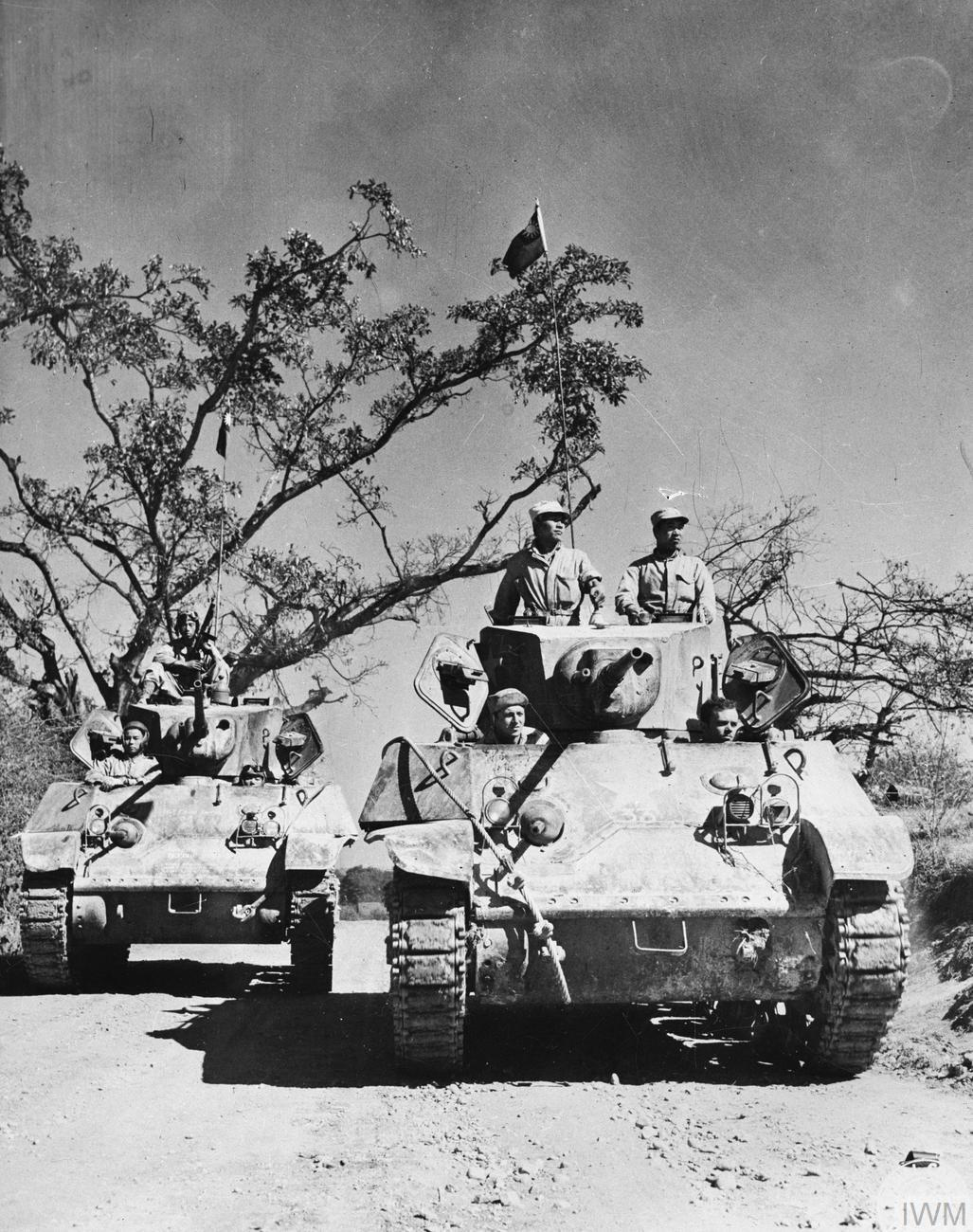
Republic of China Army operating the M3A3 Stuart tanks on Ledo Road

The other major Lend-Lease recipient of the M3, the Soviet Union, was even more dissatisfied with the tank, considering it undergunned, underarmored, likely to catch fire, and too sensitive to fuel quality. The narrow tracks were highly unsuited to operation in winter conditions, as they resulted in high ground pressures that sank the tank. However, the Stuart was superior to early-war Soviet light tanks such as the T-60, which were often underpowered and possessed even lighter armament than the Stuart. In 1943, the Red Army tried out the M5 and decided that the upgraded design wasn't much better than the M3. Being less desperate than in 1941, the Soviets turned down an American offer to supply the M5. M3s continued to see limited usage in the Red Army at least until 1944.

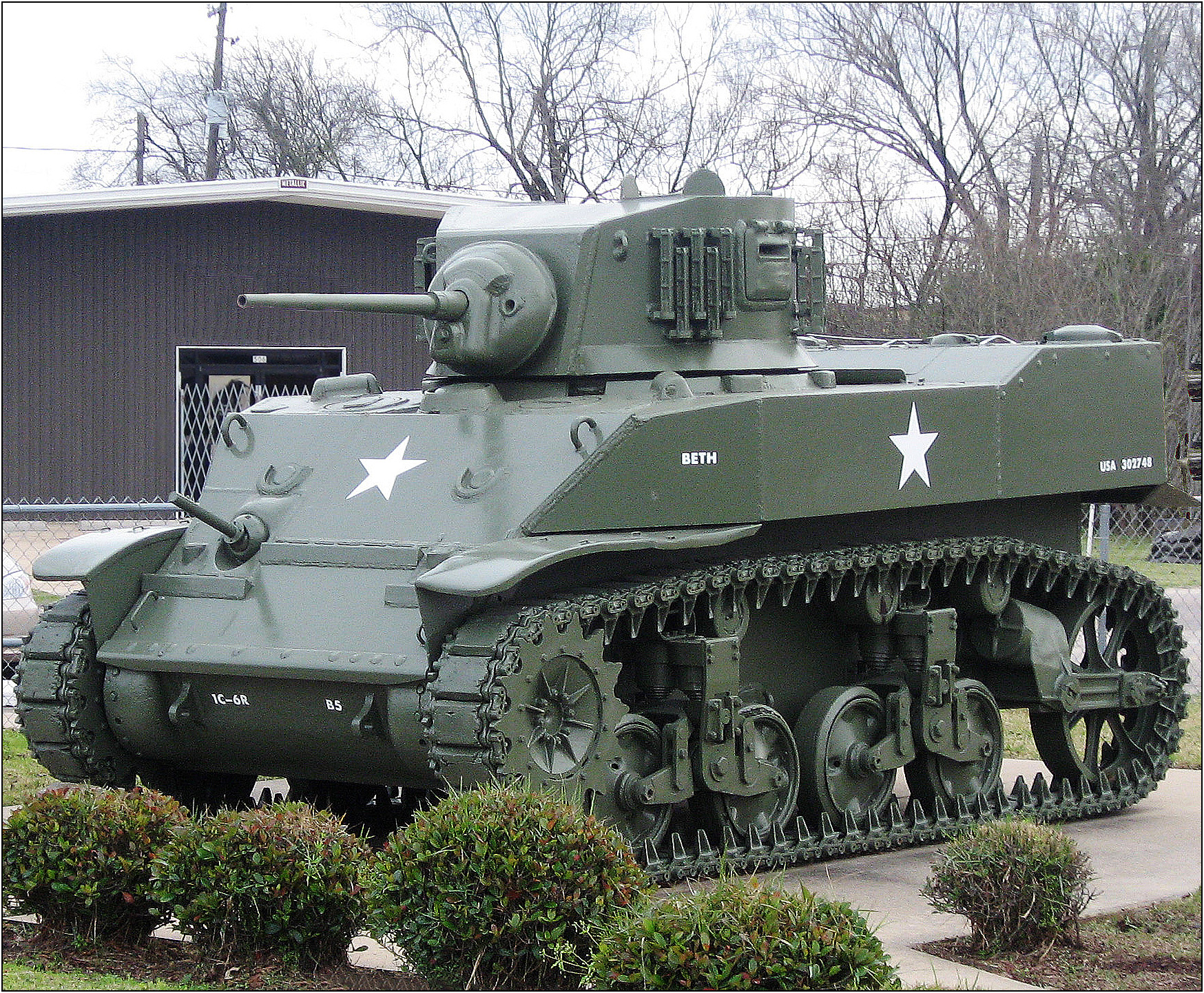
M5 Stuart tank on display in South Houston, Texas

In US Army service, the M3 first saw combat in the Philippines. Two battalions, comprising the Provisional Tank Group fought in the Bataan peninsula campaign. In 1941, the US Army Chief of Staff, General George C. Marshall, directed that the army's new M3 Stuart light tanks, then just rolling off the assembly lines, were to have the highest priority in reinforcing General MacArthur's command in the Pacific. The activated Army National Guard 194th and 192nd Tank Battalions were each equipped with 54 of the newly manufactured M3 Stuart light tanks, along with 23 half-tracks per battalion. The federalized California Army Guard 194th Tank Battalion deployed from San Francisco on 8 September 1941, arriving in the Philippines on 26 September. That deployment was followed by the 192nd Tank Battalion, which had been training at Fort Knox, which reached Manila in November.

On 21 November 1941, the 192nd and 194th Tank Battalions were combined to form the Provisional Tank Group under the command of Colonel James R.N. Weaver. With the subsequent commencement of hostilities, and Japanese landings along the coastlines in December, the Provisional Tank Group was ordered to counterattack the landing forces, and to cover the allied retreat towards the Bataan Peninsula.

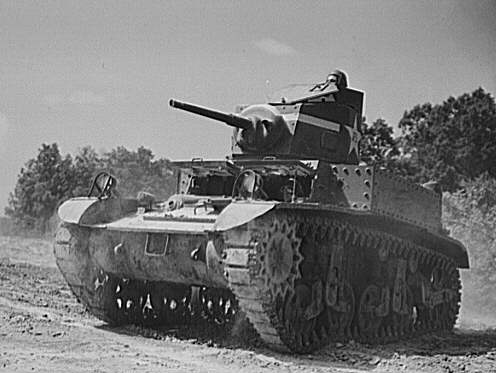
U.S. Army M3 Stuart tank at Fort Knox, Kentucky

On 22 December 1941, the 192nd Tank Battalion became the first American unit to engage enemy armor in tank-to-tank combat during World War II as they ran into tanks from the Imperial Japanese Army 4th Tank Regiment. The M3s of the 192nd Tank Battalion went up against the equally armed Type 95 Ha-Go light tank, which were armed with the 37mm cannon, but were equipped with diesel engines. The Type 95 had been at the forefront of tank technology when it was fielded in 1935. Both the 192nd and the 194th Tank Battalions continued to skirmish with the 4th Tank Regiment, as they retreated towards Bataan. During the remaining struggle for Bataan, the two Tank Battalions tried to defend the beaches, the airfield, and provide support for the infantry, until 8 April 1942, when the 192nd and 194th received orders to prepare to destroy their M3s. They were not entirely successful, as many of the M3 Stuarts were captured and used by the enemy during the war. When the Philippines were liberated in 1944/45, some of the captured M3 Stuart light tanks were taken back by US forces. The unit withdrew to the Bataan Peninsula as part of the general retreat, and ceased to exist on 9 April 1942 when the last surviving American and Philippine forces on the Bataan Peninsula surrendered.

When the American Army joined the North African Campaign in late 1942, Stuart units still formed a large part of its armor strength, until they were eventually replaced with M4 Shermans.

After the disastrous Battle of the Kasserine Pass, the US quickly disbanded most of their light tank battalions and subordinated the Stuarts to medium tank battalions, performing the traditional cavalry missions of scouting and screening. For the rest of the war, most US tank battalions had three companies of M4 Shermans and one company of M3s or M5/M5A1s.

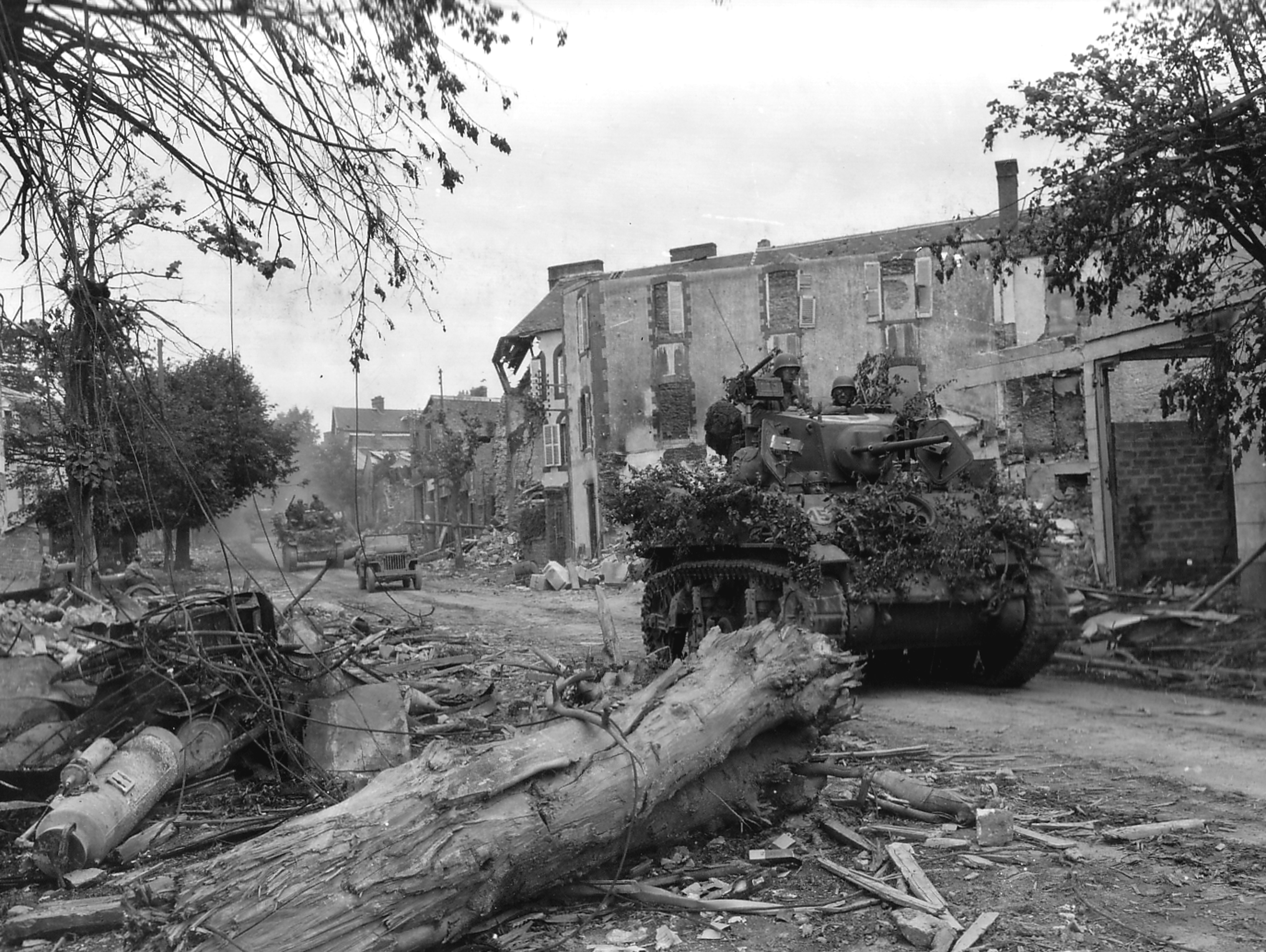
Light Tank M5A1 Stuart.

In the European Theatre, Allied light tanks had to be given cavalry and infantry fire support roles since their main cannon armament could not compete with heavier enemy units. However, the Stuart was still effective in combat in the Pacific Theater, as Japanese tanks were both relatively rare and were generally much weaker than even Allied light tanks. Japanese infantrymen were poorly equipped with anti-tank weapons and tended to attack tanks using close-assault tactics. In this environment, the Stuart was only moderately more vulnerable than medium tanks. In addition, the poor terrain and roads common to the theater were unsuitable for the much heavier M4 medium tanks, and so initially, only light armor could be deployed. Heavier M4s were eventually brought to overcome heavily entrenched positions, though the Stuart continued to serve in a combat capacity until the end of the war.

The US liquidated its Stuarts when it got sufficient numbers of M24 Chaffees, but the tank remained in service until the end of the war and well after. In addition to the United States, United Kingdom and Soviet Union, who were the primary users, it was also used by France and China.

==== M22 Locust ====
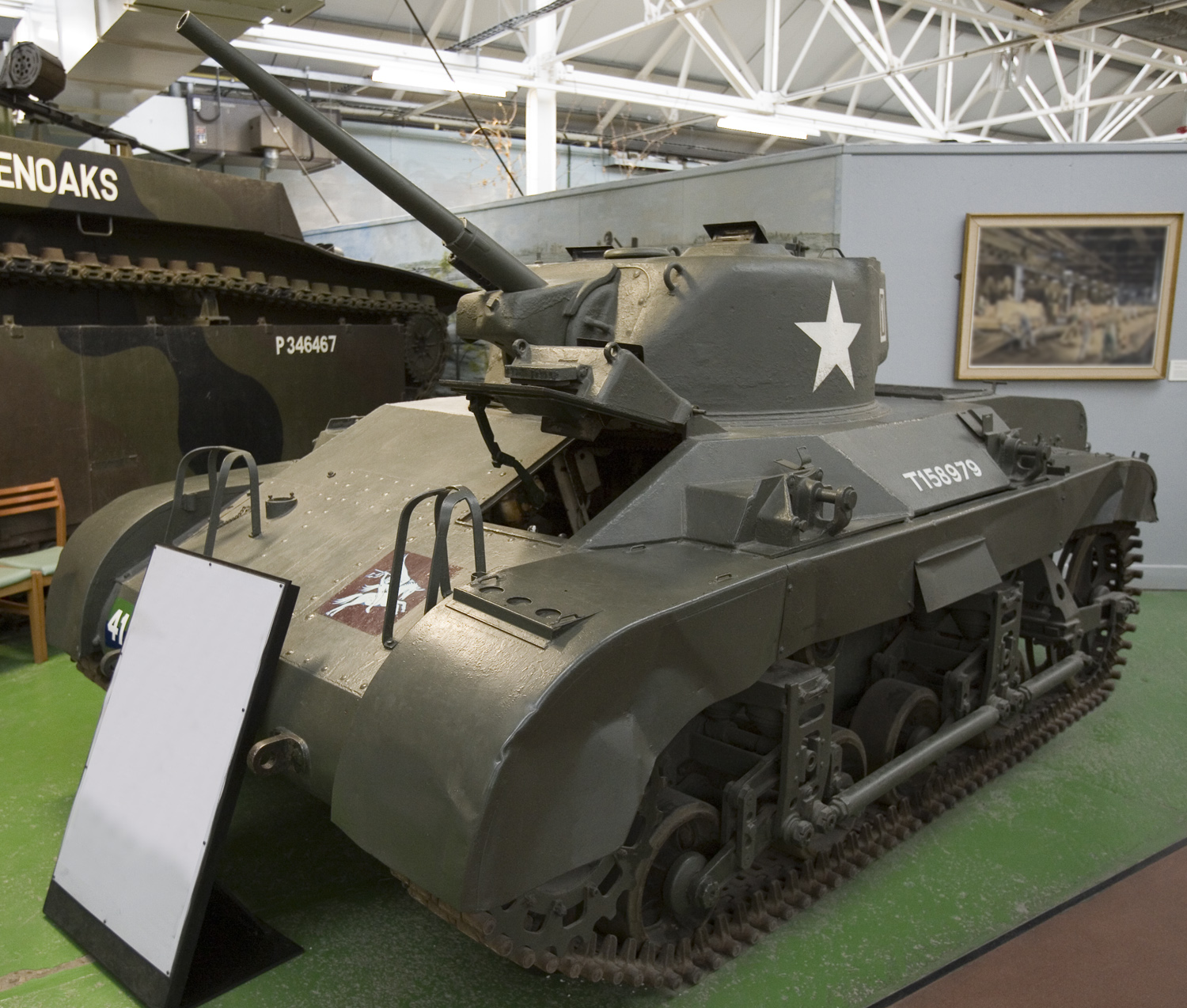
M22 Locust light tank

The light tank (airborne) M22, also known as the Locust, began development in late 1941 in response to a request by the British military earlier in the year for an airmobile light tank which could be transported onto a battlefield by glider. The United States Ordnance Department was asked to produce this tank, which in turn selected Marmon-Herrington to design and build a prototype airborne tank in May 1941. The prototype was designed so that it could be transported underneath a Douglas C-54 Skymaster transport aircraft, although it would also fit inside a General Aircraft Hamilcar glider.

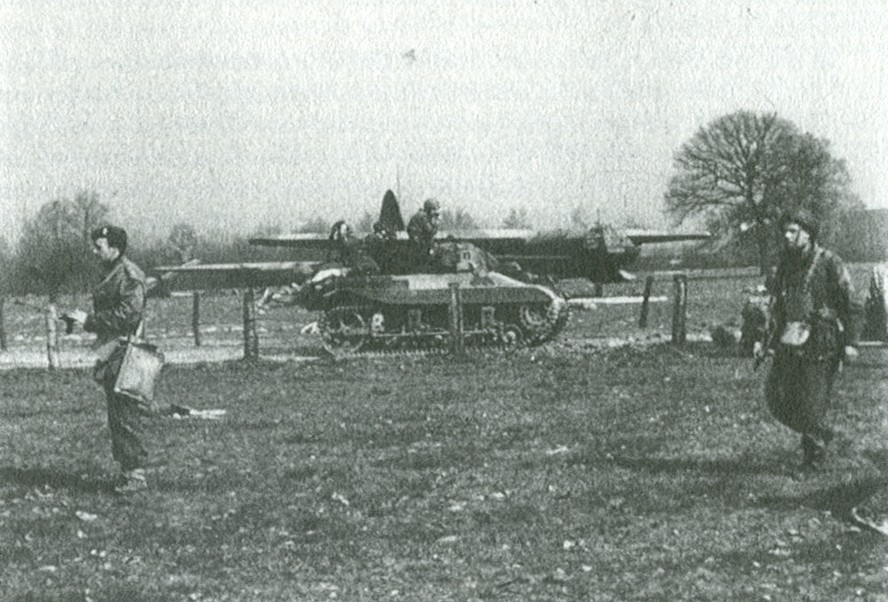
Locust in action during Operation Varsity, March 1945

After a series of modifications were made to the initial prototype, production began in April 1943. It was significantly delayed, however, when several faults were found with the tank's design. Marmon-Herrington only began to produce significant numbers of the T9 in late 1943 and early 1944, and by then the design was considered to be obsolete; only 830 were built by the time production ended in February 1945. As a result, the Ordnance Department gave the tank the specification number M22 but no American combat units were equipped with it.

However, during 1943, the War Office believed that the tank would perform adequately despite its faults that came to light, so the tank was given the title of 'Locust' and 260 were shipped to Great Britain under the Lend-Lease Act. Seventeen Locusts were received by the 6th Airborne Armoured Reconnaissance Regiment in late 1943. Eight were eventually used during the airborne Operation Varsity in March 1945. The tanks did not perform well in action and Locusts were never used in action again.

==== M24 Chaffee ====
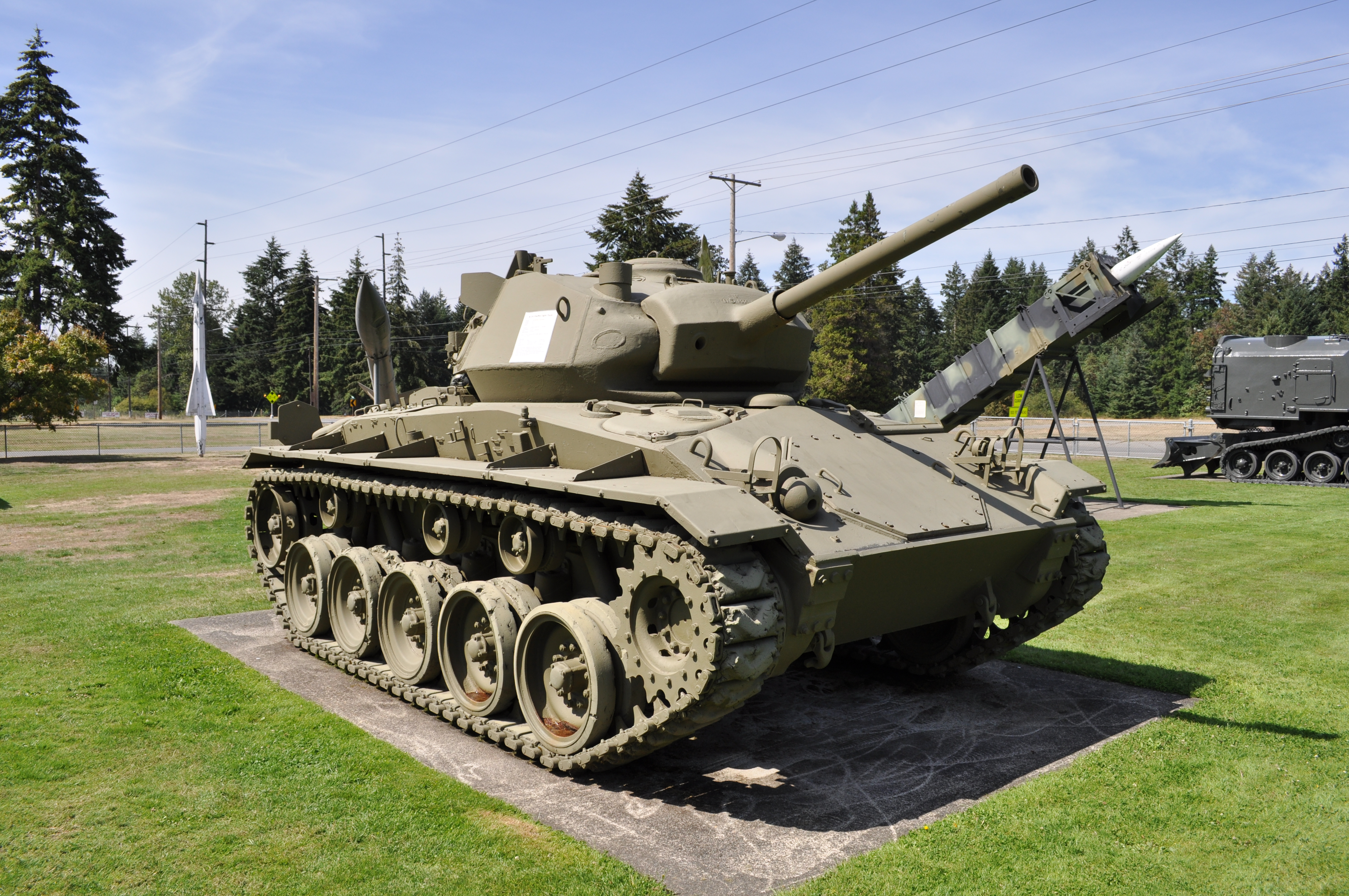
M24 Chaffee on display at Fort Lewis Military Museum, Fort Lewis, Washington.

In April 1943 the government started work on the M24 Chaffee, designated light tank T24 as a replacement for the M3/M5 Stuart after the original replacement, the M7, was rejected in March. Every effort was made to keep the weight of the vehicle under 20 tons. The armor was kept light, and a lightweight 75mm gun was developed. The design also featured wider tracks and torsion bar suspension. It had a relatively low silhouette and a three-man turret. In mid-October the first pilot vehicle was delivered and production began in 1944 under the designation "Light Tank M24". 4,730 were produced by the time production stopped in August 1945.

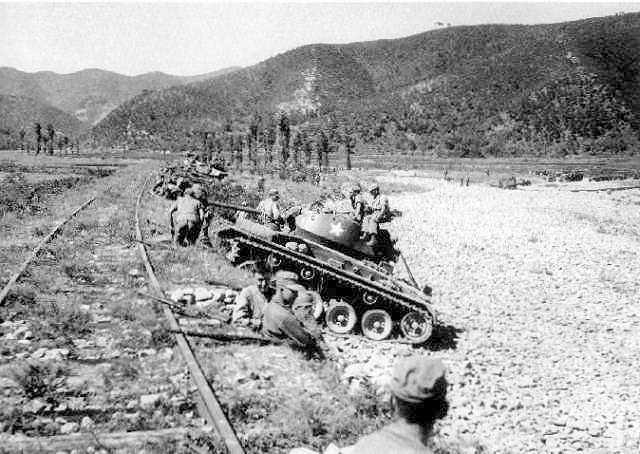
M24 Chaffee light tanks of the 25th Infantry Division, U.S. Army, wait for an assault of North Korean T-34-85 tanks at Masan.

The first thirty four M24s reached Europe in November 1944 and were issued to the U.S. 2nd Cavalry Group (Mechanized) in France. These were then issued to F Company, 2nd Cavalry Reconnaissance Battalion and F Company, 42nd Cavalry Reconnaissance Battalion which each received seventeen M24s. During the Battle of the Bulge in December 1944, these units and their new tanks were rushed to the southern sector; two of the M24s were detached to serve with the 740th Tank Battalion of the U.S. First Army.

The M24 started to enter widespread issue in December 1944 but were slow in reaching the front-line combat units. By the end of the war, many armored divisions were still mainly equipped with the M5. Some armored divisions did not receive their first M24s until the war was over.

Reports were generally positive. Crews liked the improved offroad performance and reliability, but were most appreciative of the 75 mm main gun, which was a vast improvement over the 37 mm. The M24 was not up to the challenge of fighting tanks, but the bigger gun gave it a chance to defend itself when required. Regardless, its light armor still left it vulnerable.

The M24's service during World War II was insignificant, as too few arrived too late to replace the M5s of the armored divisions, but the M24 saw extensive use in the Korean War.

In the Korean War, M24s were the initial US tanks directed to combat the North Korean T-34-85s. The occupation troops in Japan from which the tanks were drawn were inexperienced and under-equipped due to rapid demobilization after World War II. The M24 fared poorly against these better armed, better armored, and better crewed medium tanks, losing most of their number while inflicting only minor damage on the T-34 units.

=== Medium and heavy tanks ===
==== M3 Lee ====
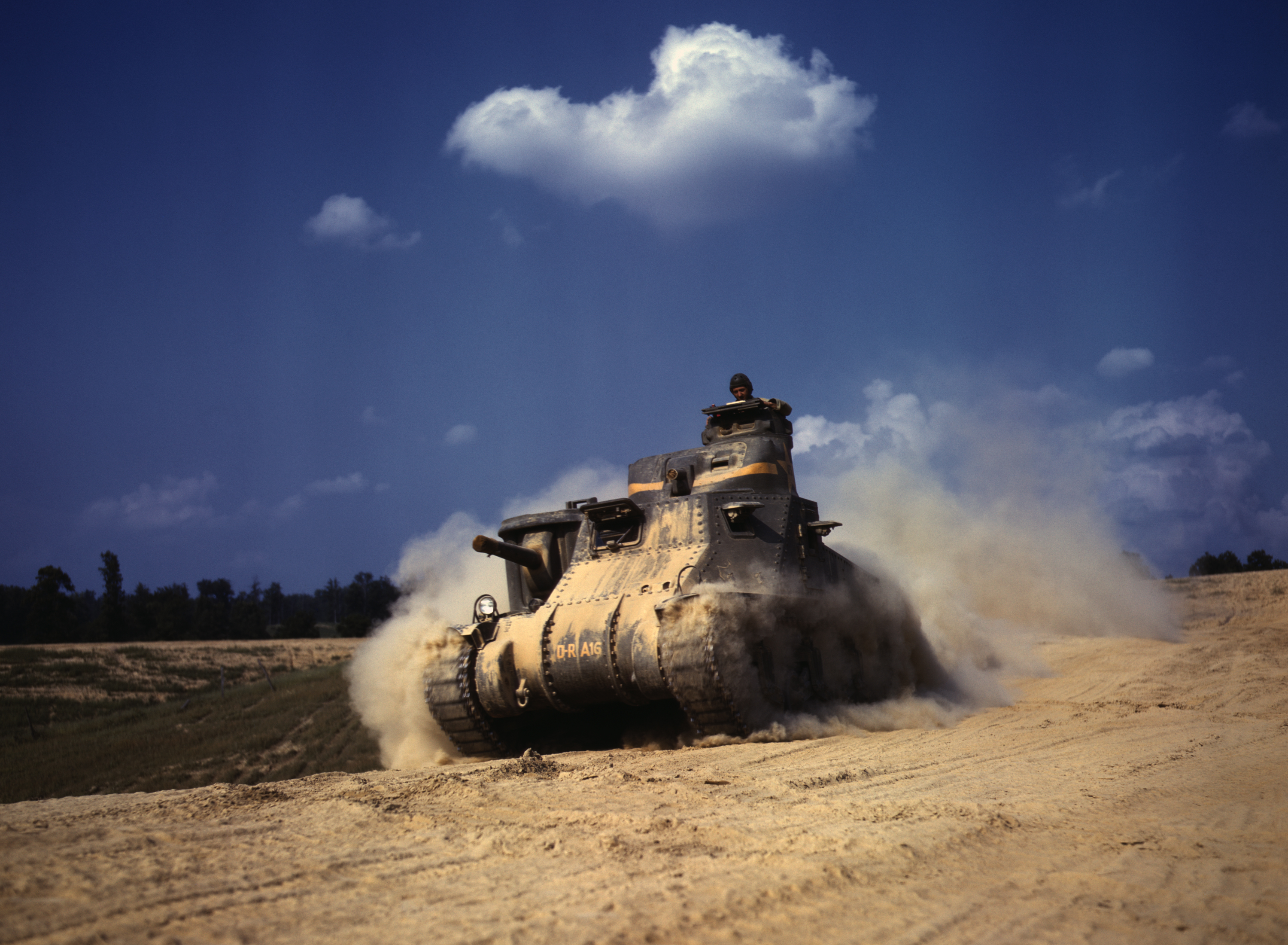
M3 Lee at Fort Knox, June 1942

The medium tank M3 replaced the M2 medium tank and design commenced in July 1940, and the first "Lees" were operational in late 1941. Many were sent to the British where the tank was called the "General Grant" (after General Ulysses S. Grant). M3 tanks with the American turret were called "General Lee" (after Confederate General Robert E. Lee).

The U.S. Army needed a good tank and coupled with Great Britain's demand for 3,650 medium tanks immediately, the Lee began production by late 1940. The M3 was well armed and armored for the period, but due to design flaws (high silhouette, archaic sponson mounting of the main gun, below average offroad performance) it was not satisfactory and was withdrawn from front line duty as soon as the M4 Sherman became available in large numbers, although the British managed to use the M3 successfully against the Imperial Japanese Army in Burma until 1945.

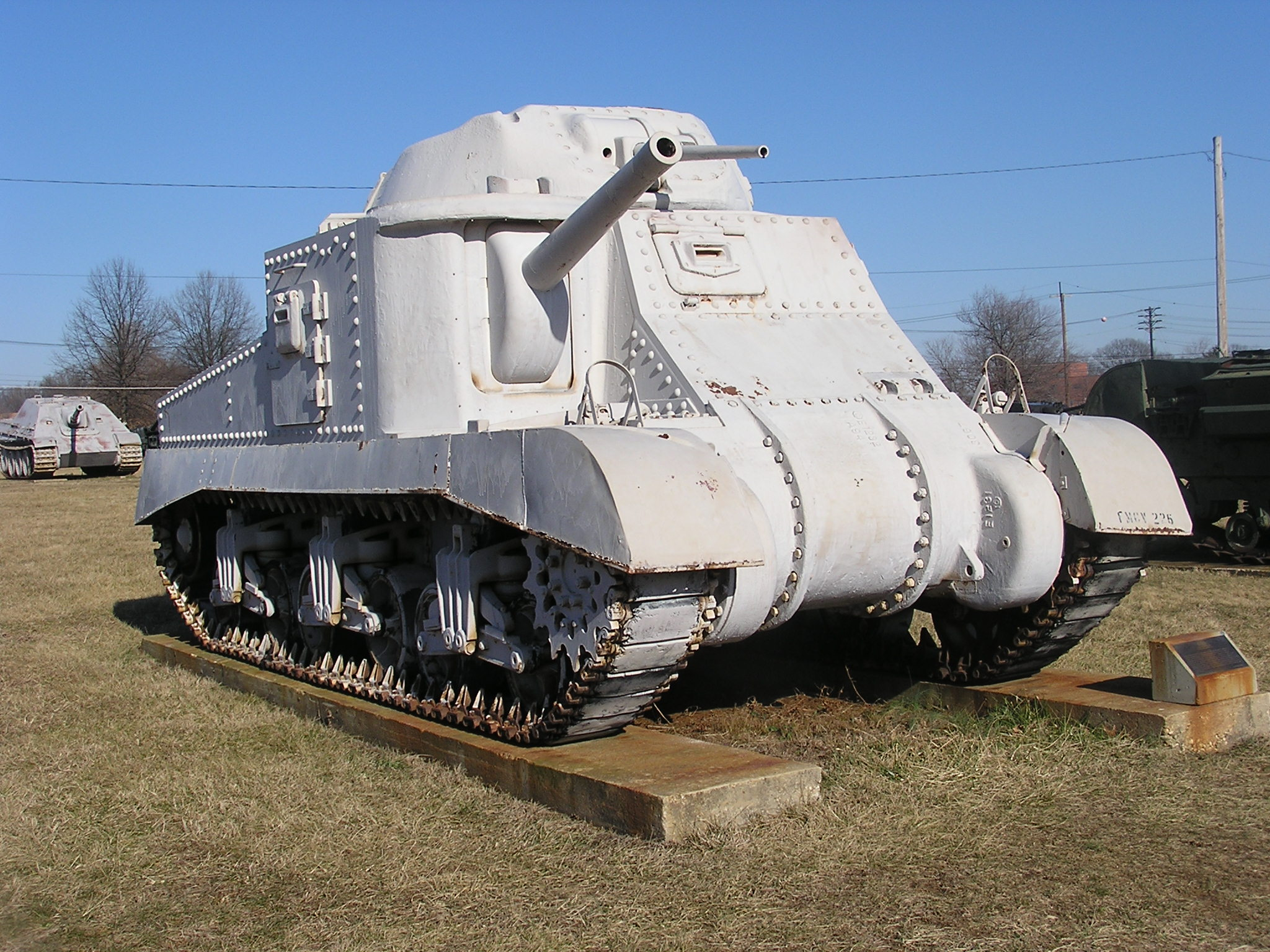
M3 Grant at the US Army Ordnance Museum, Aberdeen, Maryland.

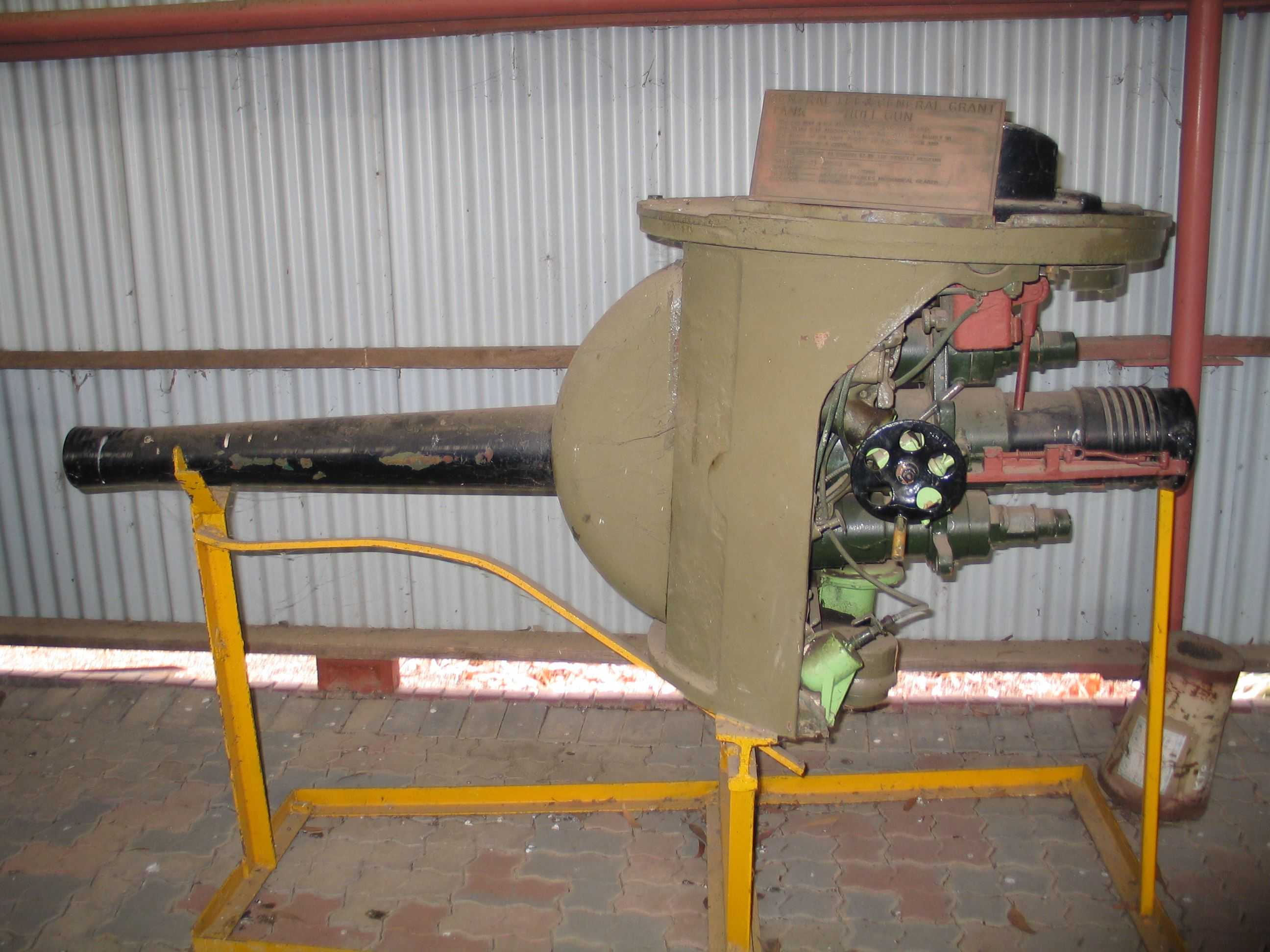
M2 75 mm gun as mounted in medium tank M3

When the U.S. entered the war, the M2 series medium tank design was obsolete with a 37 mm gun, 32 mm frontal armor, machine gun main armament and a very high silhouette. The success of the Wehrmacht in the French campaign, led by the Panzer III and Panzer IV, convinced the U.S. Army to immediately order a new medium tank armed with a 75 mm gun in a turret, which would ultimately become the M4 Sherman. However, until the Sherman was in production, an interim design with a 75 mm gun was urgently needed, and this is where the M3 came in.

The M3's design was somewhat unusual as the main weapon, a larger caliber, medium-velocity 75 mm gun, was mounted in an offset sponson within the hull, giving the gun a limited traverse. A small turret with a lighter, high-velocity 37 mm gun sat on the tall hull. An even smaller cupola on top of the turret held a Browning M1919. The British ordered the M3 when they were refused permission to have their own tank designs (the Matilda infantry tank and Crusader cruiser tank) made by American factories. British experts had viewed the mock-up in 1940 and identified several flaws — the high profile, the hull mounted gun, radio in the hull, smooth tracks, the amount of armor with insufficient attention to splash-proofing the joints. The British agreed to order 1,250 M3s, to be modified to their requirements - the order was subsequently increased with the expectation that when a superior tank was available it could replace part of the order. Contracts were arranged with three U.S. companies, and the total cost was approximately US$240 million. This sum was all of the British funds in the US and it took the Lend-Lease Act to solve the financial problems.

The prototype was completed in March 1941 and production models followed with the first British specification tanks in July. The British cast turret included a bustle at the back for the Wireless Set No. 19 radio. It had thicker armour than the U.S. one and removed the U.S. cupola for a simple hatch. Both U.S. and British tanks had thicker armor than first planned. The British design required one fewer crew member than the US version due to the radio in the turret. The U.S. eventually eliminated the full-time radio operator, assigning the task to the driver. After extensive losses in Africa and Greece, the British realized that to meet their needs for tanks, both the Lee and the Grant types would need to be accepted.

The U.S. military utilized the "M" (Model) letter to designate nearly all of their equipment. When the British Army received their new M3 medium tanks from the US, confusion immediately set in, as the M3 medium tank and the M3 light tank were identically named. The British Army began naming their American tanks, although the U.S. Army never used those terms until after the war. The M3 tanks with the British turret and radio setup received the name "General Grant", while the original M3s were called "General Lee", or more usually just "Grant" and "Lee". The M3 brought much-needed firepower to British forces in the North African desert campaign.

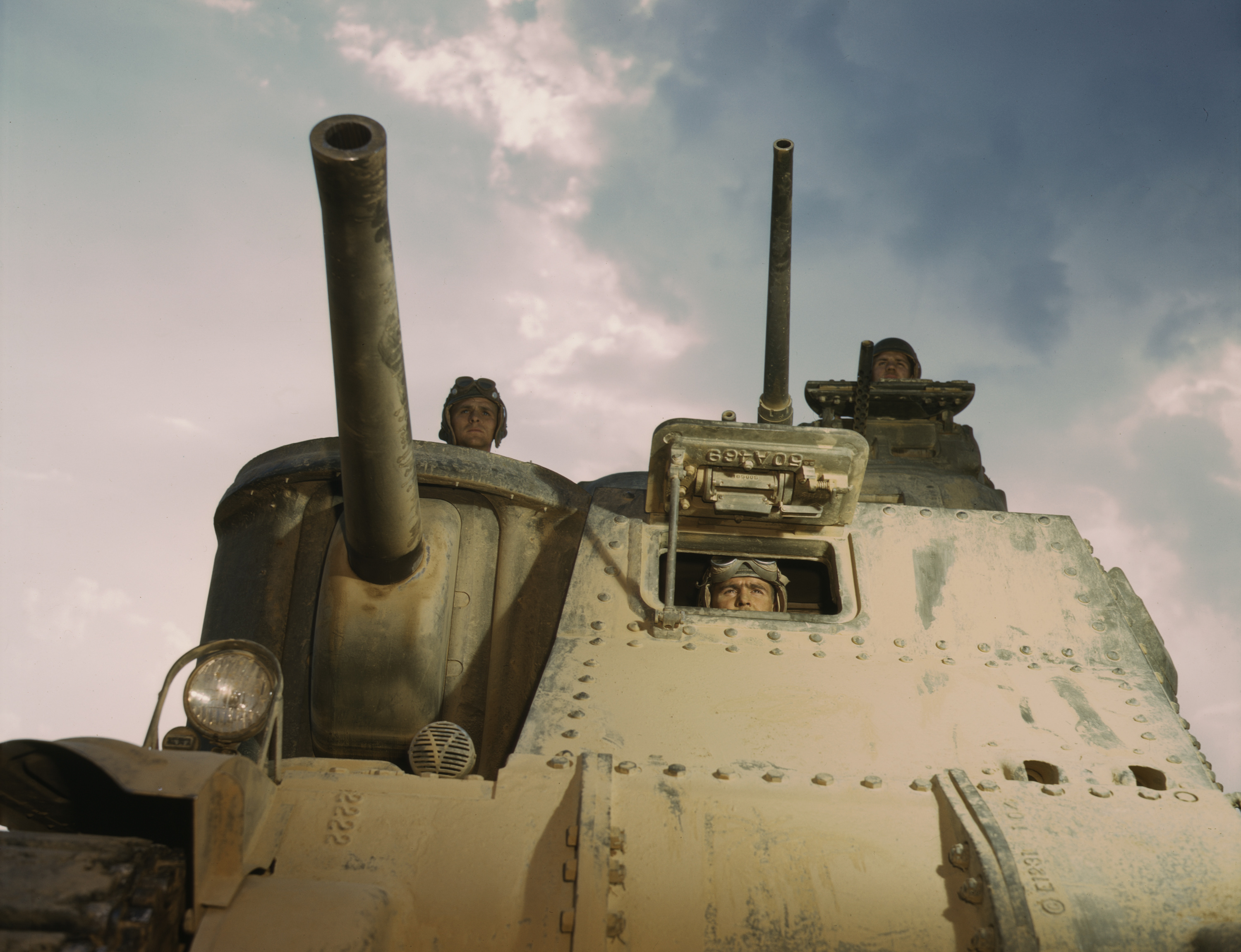
Front view of an M3.

The 75 mm was operated by a gunner and a loader. The 75 mm gun used an M1 periscope, with an integral telescope, which was mounted on top of the sponson for sighting. The periscope rotated with the gun. The sight was marked from zero to 3,000 yd (2,700 m) with vertical markings to aid deflection shooting at a moving target. The gunner laid the gun on target through geared handwheels for traverse and elevation.

The 37 mm was aimed through the M2 periscope, though this was mounted in the mantlet to the side of the gun. It also sighted the coaxial machine gun. Two range scales were provided: 0-1,500 yd (1,400 m) for the 37 mm and 0-1,000 yd (910 m) for the machine gun.

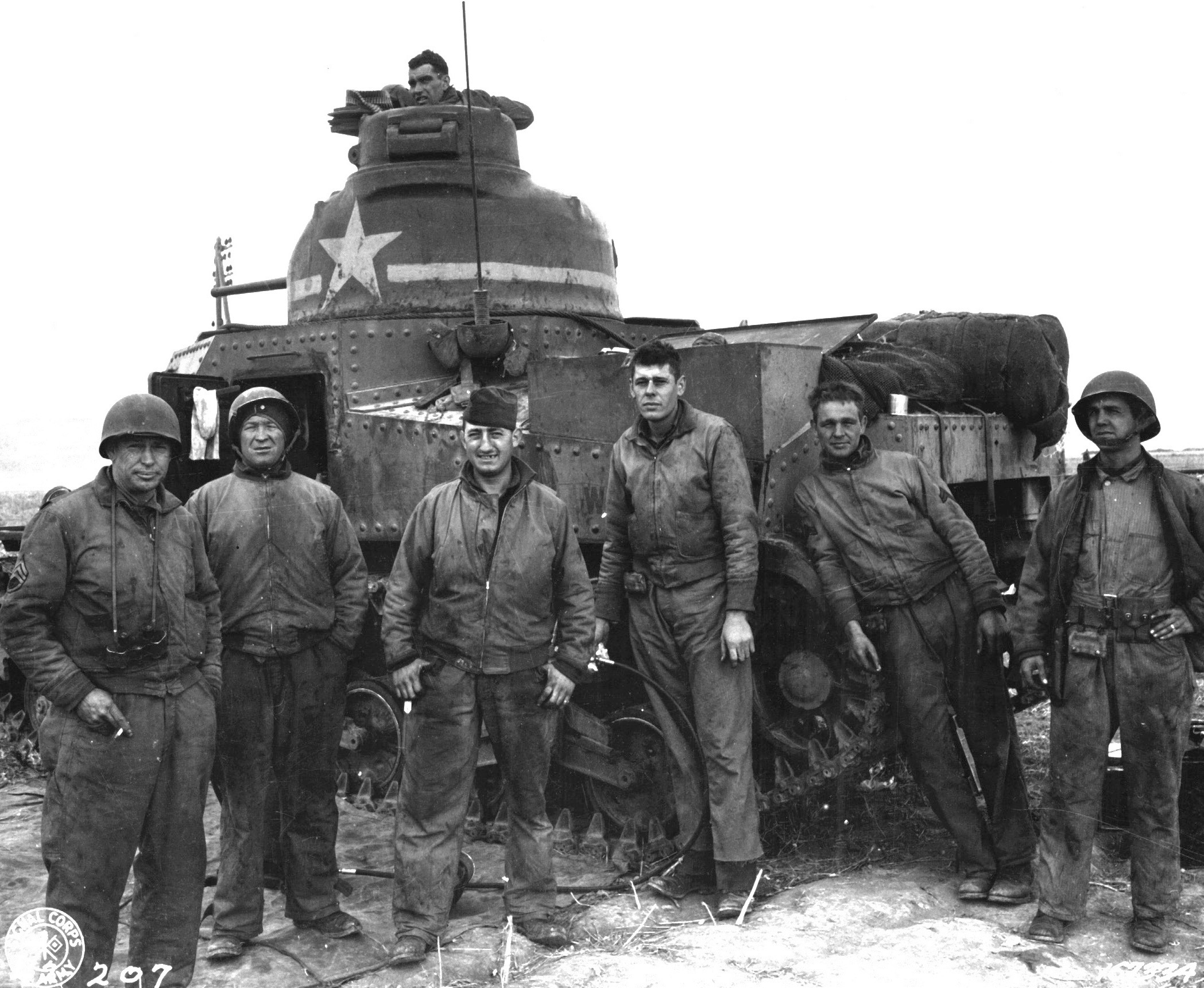
M3 tank crew at Souk el Arba, Tunisia, 23 November 1942

Of the 6,258 M3s produced by the U.S., 2,855 were supplied to the British Army, and about 1,368 to the Soviet Union. Consequently, one of the American M3 medium tank's first actions during the war was in 1942, during the North African Campaign. British Lees and Grants were in action against Rommel's forces at the disastrous Battle of Gazala on 27 May that year. They continued to serve in North Africa until the end of the campaign. A regiment of M3 Mediums was also used by the U.S. 1st Armored Division in North Africa. In the North African campaign, the M3 was generally appreciated for its mechanical reliability, good armor and heavy firepower.

In all three areas, it outclassed the available British tanks and was able to fight German tanks and towed anti-tank guns. The tall silhouette and low, hull-mounted 75 mm were severe tactical drawbacks, since they prevented the tank from fighting from hull-down firing positions. The use of riveted armor led to a problem called "spalling", whereby the impact of enemy shells would cause the rivets to break off and become projectiles inside the tank. Later models were welded to eliminate this problem. The M3 was replaced by the M4 Sherman as soon as these were available, though several M3s saw limited action in the battle for Normandy as armored recovery vehicles with dummy guns.

==== M4 Sherman ====
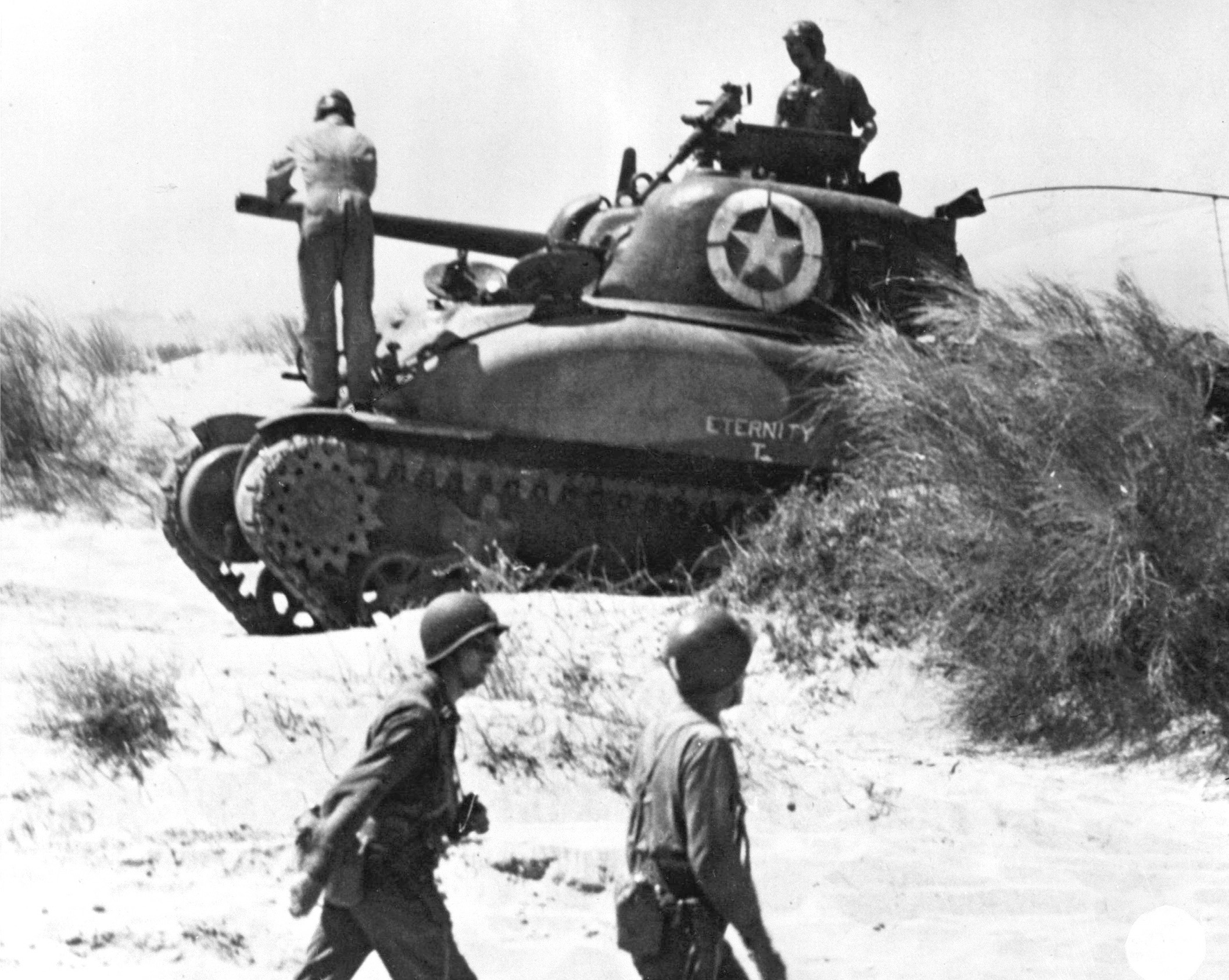
The first Sherman in U.S. service, the M4A1, entered combat first with the British in the North Africa Campaign. Here one of the 7th Army lands at Red Beach 2 on 10 July 1943, during the Allied invasion of Sicily.

The M4 was one of the best known and most used American tanks of World War II. Like the Lee and Grant, the British were responsible for the name, with this tank's namesake being Civil War General, William Tecumseh Sherman. The M4 Sherman was a medium tank that proved itself in the Allied operations of every theater of World War II. The Sherman was a relatively inexpensive, easy to maintain and produce combat system. Similar to production efforts on the part of the Soviet Union with their T-34 tank system, the M4 Sherman was the same class of mass-produced tank weapon.

The new design was put into action beginning on 31 August 1940. This medium tank would have to mount a 75 mm main gun armament into a fully-traversable turret. The new tank would also have to incorporate the engine, transmission, tracks and suspension systems of the M3 Lee medium tanks in an effort to ease production and save time. This new medium tank would also have to reduce the crew from six to five and feature improved armor allocation without increasing the vehicle's overall weight.

The design appeared as the T6 pilot model: it proved acceptable to U.S. Army officials and production was ordered for the new "M4" on 5 September 1941. Before production on the M4 ramped up, however, the M4 design was further revised to include a heavy-barrel .50 BMG M2 Browning on the turret for anti-aircraft defense. A .30-06 M1919 Browning was then added to the upper hull bow plate.

The M4A1, A2 and A3 compared.

The Army had seven main sub-designations for M4 variants during production: M4, M4A1, M4A2, M4A3, M4A4, M4A5, and M4A6. These designations did not necessarily indicate linear improvement: A4 was not meant to indicate it was better than the A3. These sub-types indicated standardized production variations, which were often manufactured concurrently at different locations. The sub-types differed mainly in engines, although the M4A1 differed from the M4 by its fully cast upper hull; the M4A4 had a longer engine system that required a longer hull, a longer suspension system, and more track blocks; M4A5 was an administrative placeholder for Canadian production; and the M4A6 had an elongated chassis, but fewer than 100 of these were produced.

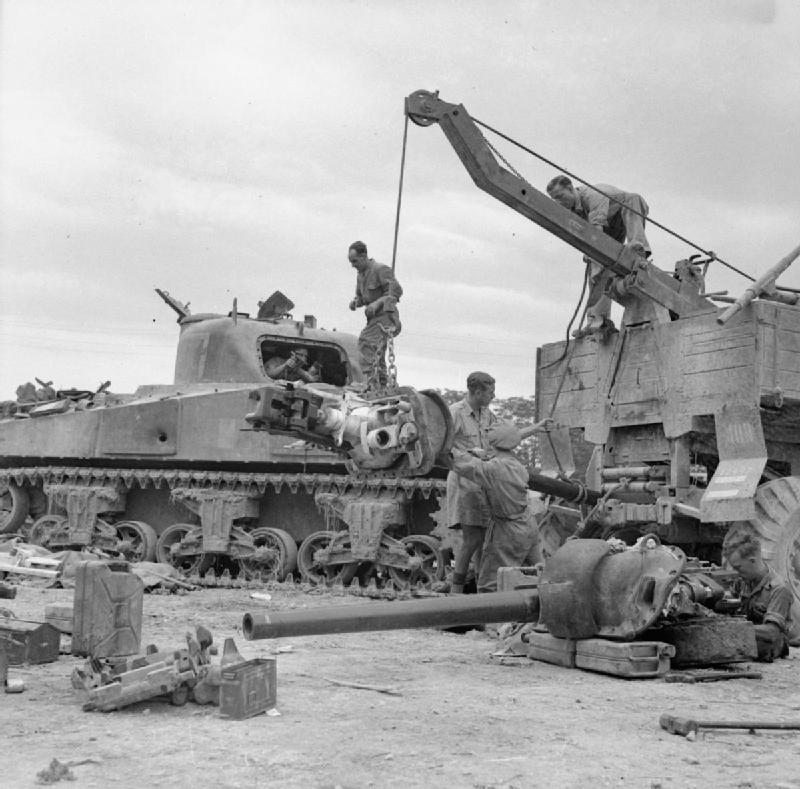
Sherman with a 88mm shell hole being stripped for parts at the British 26th Armoured Brigade workshops in Perugia, Italy, 30 June 1944

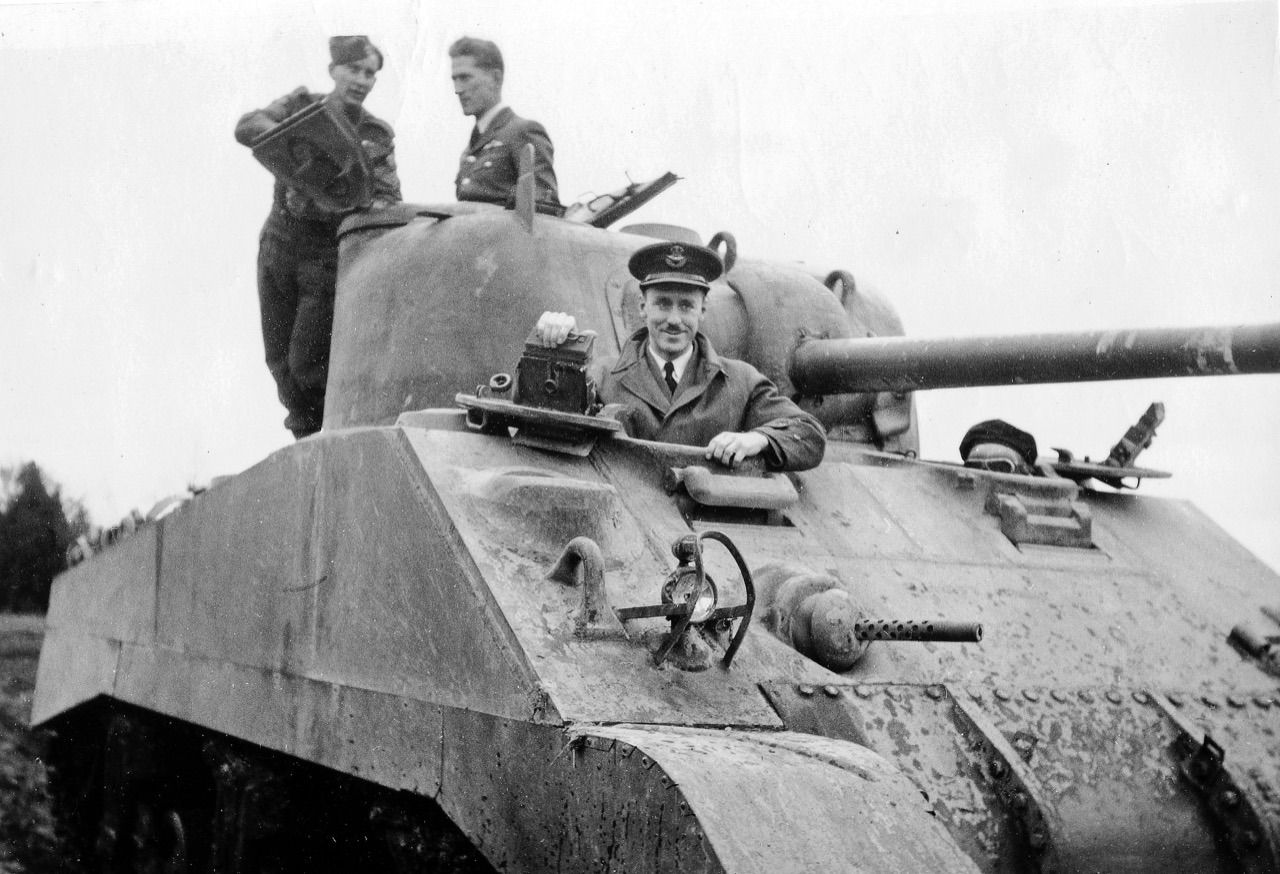
M4 tank training near Ottawa, Canada. 1943

One main problem for the Sherman design, in its various forms, was the heavier guns on the German tanks coming onto the battlefield in the latter half of the war, especially the Tiger and Panther tanks. The German Tiger I tank was armed with a powerful 88 mm gun (originally developed from the 88mm Flak Gun) that made it a very dangerous opponent for any Allied tank.

While most Shermans ran on gasoline, the M4A2 and M4A6 had diesel engines: the M4A2 with a pair of GMC 6-71 straight six-cylinder engines, the M4A6 a Caterpillar RD1820 radial. These, plus the M4A4, which used the Chrysler A57 multibank engine, were mostly supplied to Allied countries under Lend-Lease. "M4" can refer specifically to the initial sub-type with its Continental radial engine, or generically to the entire family of seven Sherman sub-types, depending on context.

Many details of production, shape, strength and performance improved throughout production, without a change to the tank's basic model number: more durable suspension units, safer "wet" (W) ammunition stowage, and stronger armor arrangements, such as the M4 composite, which had a cast front hull section mated to a welded rear hull. British nomenclature differed from that employed by the U.S. (Note: see Lend-Lease Sherman tanks#British nomenclature) The M4 Sherman was used by many of America's allies and continued to see service long after World War II.

A 24-volt electrical system was used in the M4.

Early Shermans mounted a 75 mm medium-velocity general-purpose gun. Although Ordnance began work on the medium tank T20 as a Sherman replacement, ultimately the Army decided to minimize production disruption by incorporating elements of other tank designs into the Sherman. Later M4A1, M4A2, and M4A3 models received the larger T23 turret with a high-velocity 76 mm M1 gun, which reduced the number of HE and smoke rounds carried and increased the number of anti-tank rounds.

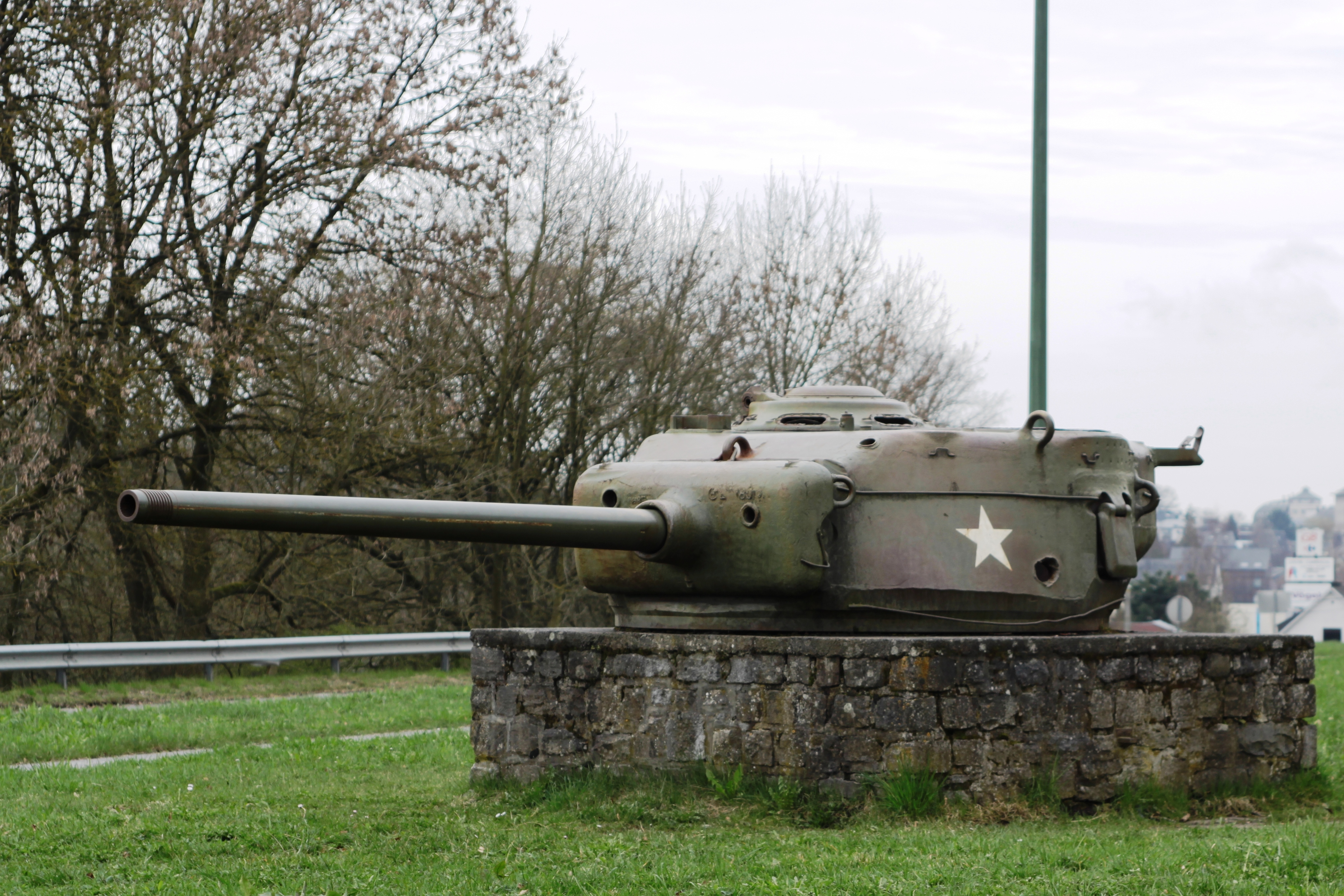
A T23 turret used on 76mm gunned Shermans, here without the muzzle brake

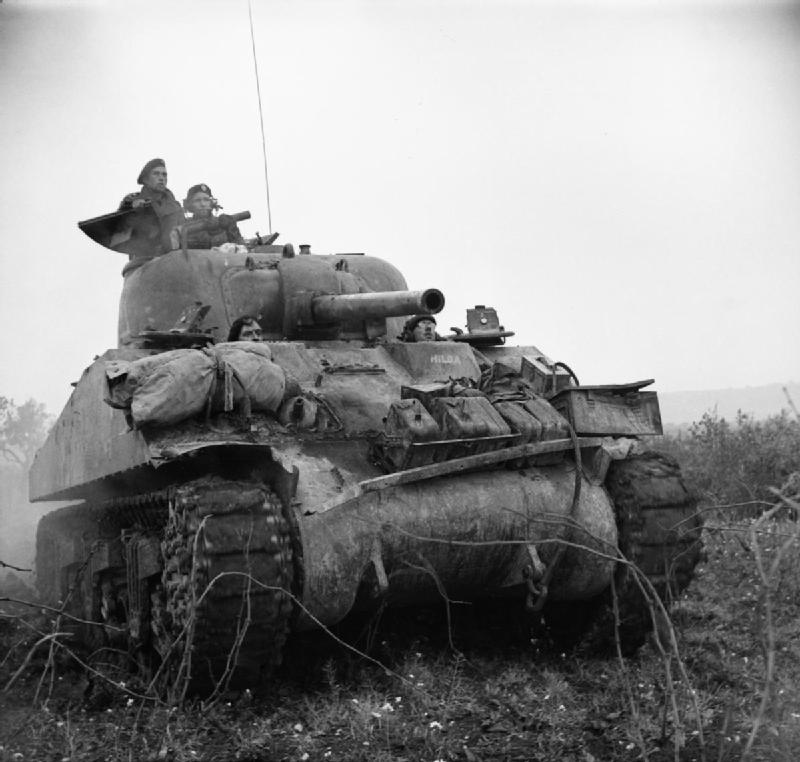
British Sherman tanks in Italy 1943

Later, the M4 and M4A3 were factory-produced with a 105 mm howitzer and a new distinctive mantlet in the original turret. The first standard-production 76 mm gun Sherman was an M4A1, accepted in January 1944, and the first standard-production 105 mm howitzer Sherman was an M4 accepted in February 1944.

In June–July 1944, the Army accepted a limited run of 254 M4A3E2 Jumbo Shermans, which had very thick armor, and the 75 mm gun in a new, heavier T23-style turret, in order to assault fortifications at Normandy Beach. Some armor points exceeded 7 inches (17 cm) in effective thickness. Some were upgraded with the 76.2 mm gun. The M4A3 was the first to be factory-produced with the horizontal volute spring suspension (HVSS) with wider tracks to distribute weight; the smooth ride of the HVSS with its experimental E8 designation led to the nickname "Easy Eight", the vehicles were designated M4A3(76)W HVSS. Some E8s were equipped with the M101 howitzer.

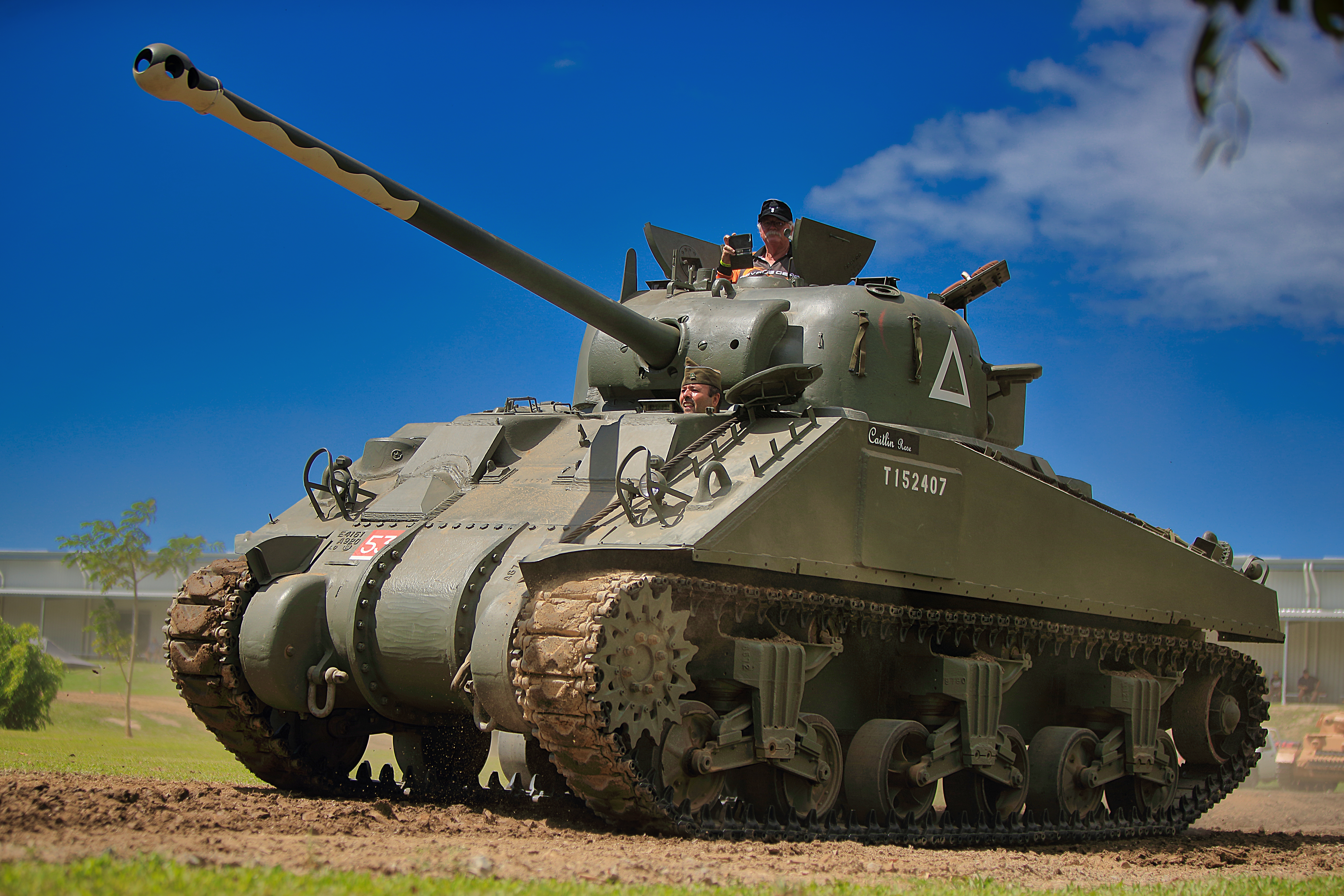
A Sherman Firefly at the Australian Armour and Artillery Museum. The Firefly is easily identified by its very long gun barrel.

Both the Americans and the British developed a wide array of special attachments for the Sherman; few saw combat, and most remained experimental. Those that saw action included the bulldozer blade for the Sherman dozer tanks, Duplex Drive (DD) for "swimming" Sherman tanks, R3 flamethrower for Zippo flame tanks, and both the T34 60-tube Calliope 4.5" rocket launcher and T40 Whizbang 7.2" rocket launcher for the Sherman turret. The British variants (DDs, Firefly, Tulips, and mine flails) were among "Hobart's Funnies" of the 79th Armoured Division. The British Sherman Firefly was the most successful of these, incorporating the Ordnance QF 17-pounder into the Sherman's chassis. It was effective, especially against the more powerful German tanks like the Tiger, and over 2,000 of them were produced.

==== M6 heavy tank ====
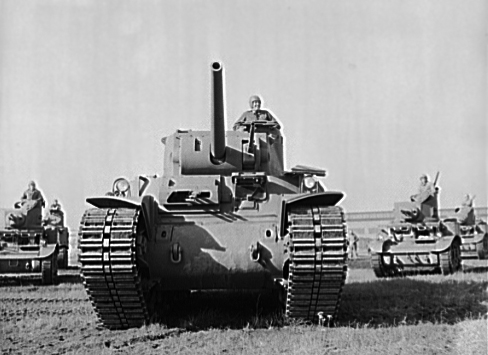
Front view of M6, with several early M3 light tanks in the background

The M6 heavy tank was a heavy tank built off of the similarly designed multi-turreted T1, armed with a 76.2 mm gun, a co-axial 37 mm gun, two .50 BMG M2 Browning and two .30-06 M1919 Browning machine guns, two in the hull and one on top of the turret. An order of 50 was placed and prototype vehicles saw trials but by the time it was ready for full-scale production the Army did not see any advantages over the M4 Sherman and planned production was cut from 5000 to 40. The M6 was declared obsolete in 1944 but was used in propaganda efforts.

==== T14 heavy tank ====
The T14 heavy tank was a joint US-British project to produce a well-armored tank that could equip both armies, armed either with the American 75 mm or British 57 mm 6-pounder gun. The British ordered over eight thousand in 1942 but by time the pilot was tested in 1944 they no longer had a need for it as the Churchill infantry tank had proven to be effective.

==== M26 Pershing ====
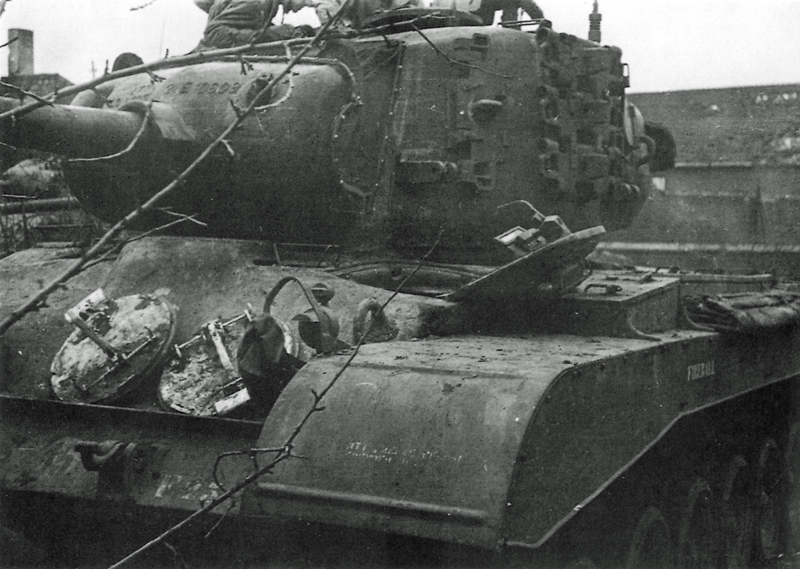
M26 Pershing T26E3 nicknamed Fireball, knocked out by a Tiger I in an ambush

The M26 Pershing heavy tank came into service in 1945 under the designation of M26 heavy tank with the name "Pershing" named after General John J. Pershing, who commanded the U.S. Army during World War One. It was developed from the T20 medium tank which itself was an attempt at a faster equivalent to the T14. T26E3 pre-production tanks saw limited combat in Germany where it held its own with the German Tiger I and Panther tanks, which were much more powerful than the M4 Sherman that the Pershing was replacing. The tank was a large improvement over the M4.

The M26 Pershing heavy tank had heavier armor, a more powerful gun, and improved torsion bar suspension compared to the Sherman. The main armament of the M26 Pershing was its 90 mm gun. Secondary .30-06 machine guns were mounted co-axially in the turret and in the bow. (Note: The terminology of nautical architecture (i.e., the terms used for the elements and layout of ships) is also used for tanks.) A .50 BMG heavy machine gun was mounted on top of the turret.

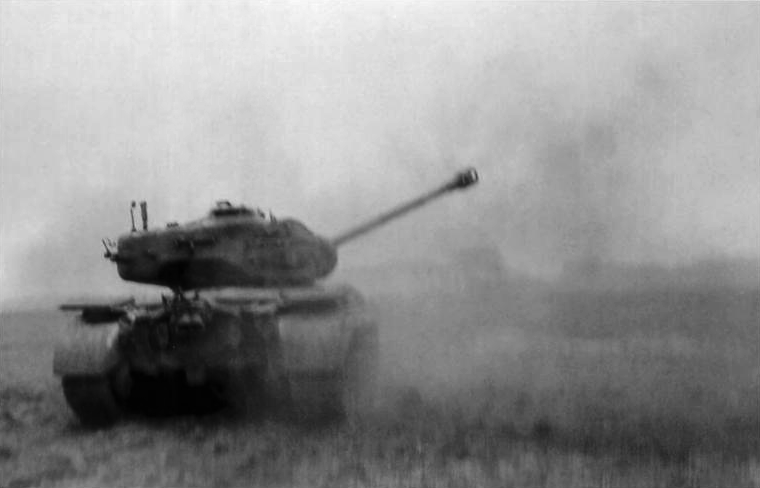
M26 Pershing fires at German positions at Remagen, March 1945.

One T26E1 had been fitted with an experimental longer version of the 90 mm gun mounted in the turret. It was shipped to Europe, where extra armor taken from a German tank was welded on. Nicknamed "Super Pershing" it was comparable to the German Tiger II in firepower and protection and was one of only two deployed to Europe during World War II. It saw combat in mid-1945.

A total of 2,222 M26 Pershing tanks were produced, beginning in November 1944, only 20 of which saw combat in Europe during World War II. The tank was reclassified as a medium tank in May 1946, and while it didn't have time to make any impact in the Second World War, it served with distinction in the Korean War alongside the M4A3E8 Sherman. In combat it was, unlike the M4 Sherman, fairly equal in firepower and protection to both the Tiger I and Panther tanks, but shared their main faults, underpowered and mechanically unreliable.

=== Tank destroyers and assault guns ===
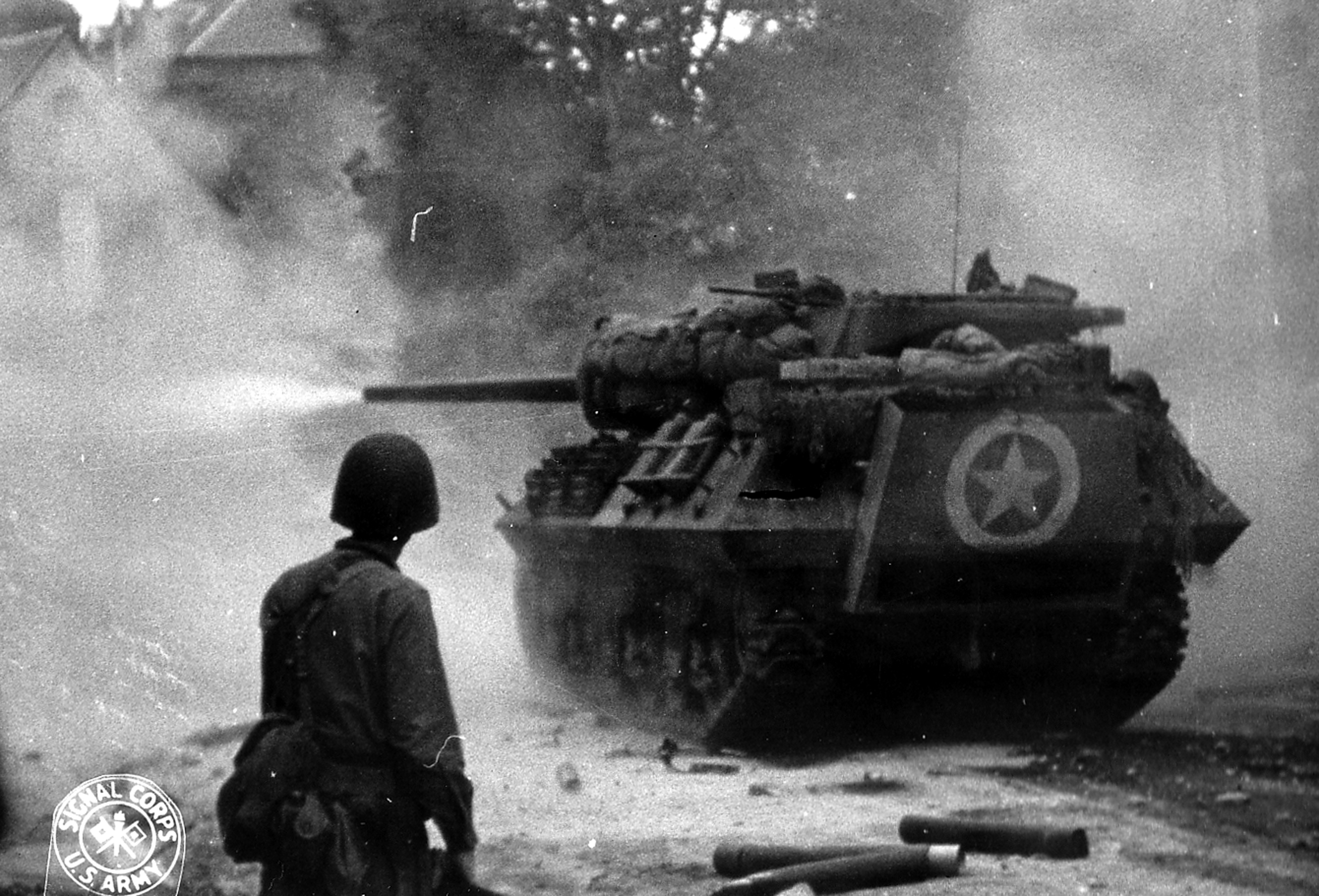
M10 in action near Saint-Lô, June 1944.

Alongside tanks, the US Army employed tracked "tank destroyers" (self-propelled anti-tank guns) based on tank hulls with more powerful guns but giving up armor protection for the crew. These were designated "Gun Motor Carriage" and followed earlier half-track designs.

==== M10 GMC ====
The 3-inch gun motor carriage M10 was a 3-inch gun in open-topped turret on a M4 Sherman-based chassis.

==== M18 Hellcat ====
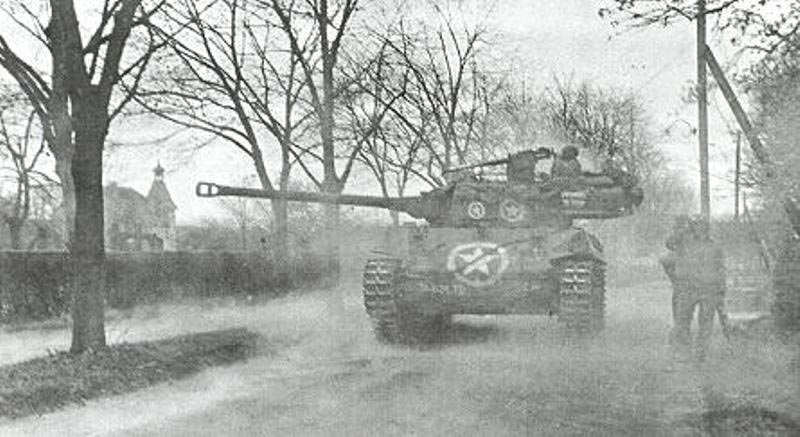
M18 Hellcat of the 824th Tank Destroyer Battalion in action at Wiesloch, Germany, April 1945.

The M18 Hellcat (officially designated the "76 mm gun motor carriage M18" or M18 GMC for short) was used in the Italian, European, and Pacific Theaters, and in the Korean War. It was the fastest armored vehicle in the American defense inventory of the 20th century, until the turboshaft-powered M1 Abrams main battle tank appeared decades later. The speed was attained by keeping armor to a minimum, no more than one inch thick and roofless, open-top turrets (a standard design feature for all American fully tracked tank destroyers of World War II) and by powering the relatively small vehicle with a radial engine originally designed for aircraft usage.

==== M36 Jackson/GMC ====
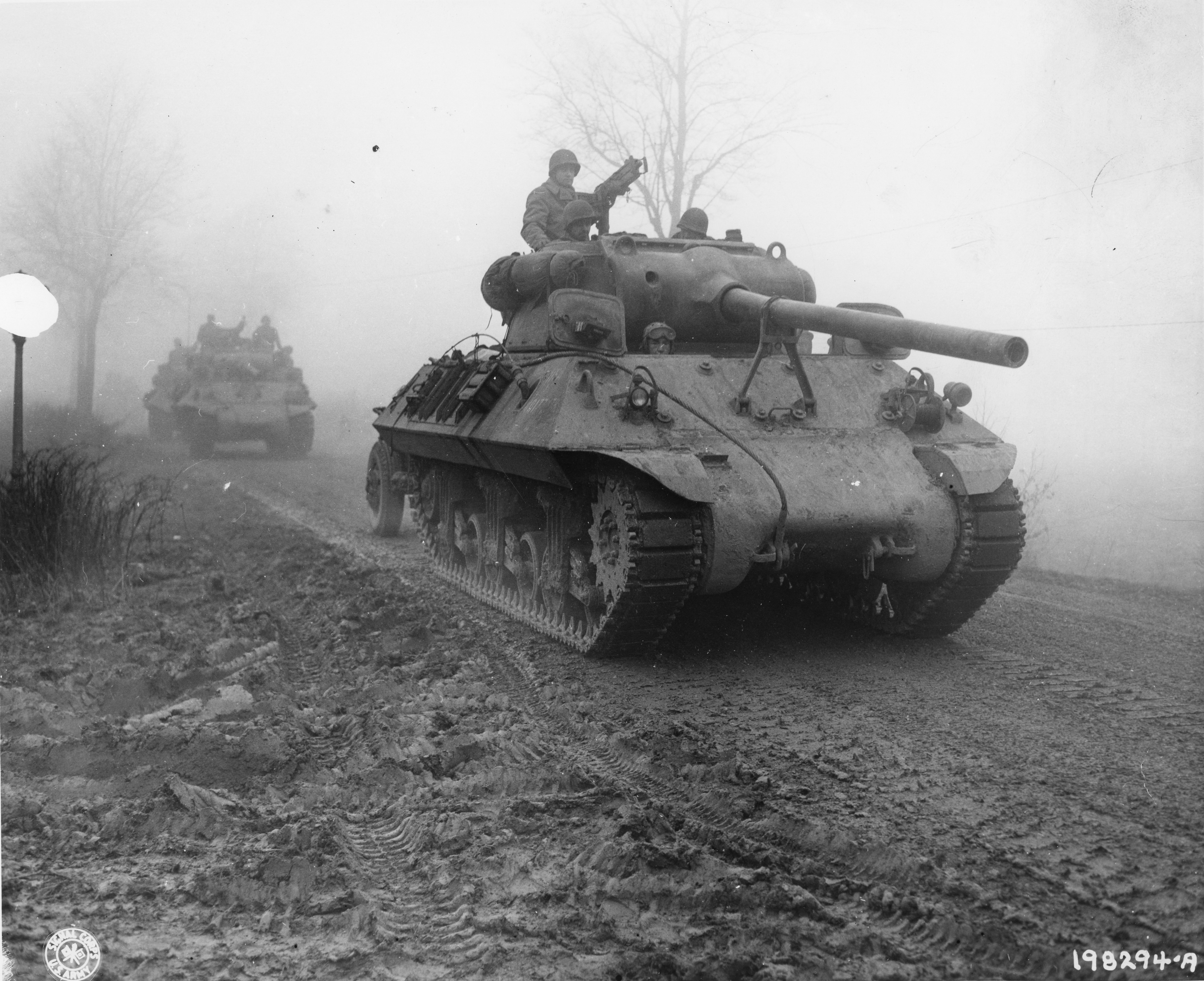
M36 tank destroyer moving in heavy fog on 20 December during Battle of the Bulge, Belgium

Together with the M10 and M18, the 90 mm gun-armed M36 gun motor carriage, provided American and Allied forces with a respectable mobile anti-tank capability against the newer German armored types. The M36 combined the hull of the M10 tank destroyer, which used the M4 Sherman's reliable chassis and drivetrain combined with sloped armor, and a new turret mounting the 90 mm gun M3. Conceived in 1943, the M36 first served in combat in Europe in October 1944, where it partially replaced the M10 tank destroyer. It also saw use in the Korean War, where it was able to defeat any of the Soviet tanks used in that conflict. Some were supplied to South Korea as part of the Military Assistance Program and served for years, as did re-engined examples found in Yugoslavia, which operated into the 1990s.

==== Howitzer motor carriage M8 ====
The howitzer motor carriage M8 aka the "Scott" was a self-propelled howitzer used for close support. It saw use on the western and Italian fronts, as well as in the Pacific. The turret had a 75 mm howitzer and was mounted on an M5 Stuart hull. It also had an M2 Browning machine gun. It went 36 mph on roads, had 9.5–44 mm of armor, and had a crew of four. It was very effective against bunkers and other stationary enemy positions. It later saw use in the First Indochina War and the Algerian War. Some self-propelled artillery and self-propelled mortar vehicles were used in the direct fire role, but the M8 and the 105 mm howitzer-armed Sherman "Jumbo" were the only vehicles dedicated for the use.

== Korean War and Cold War ==
=== Light tanks ===
==== M24 Chaffee ====
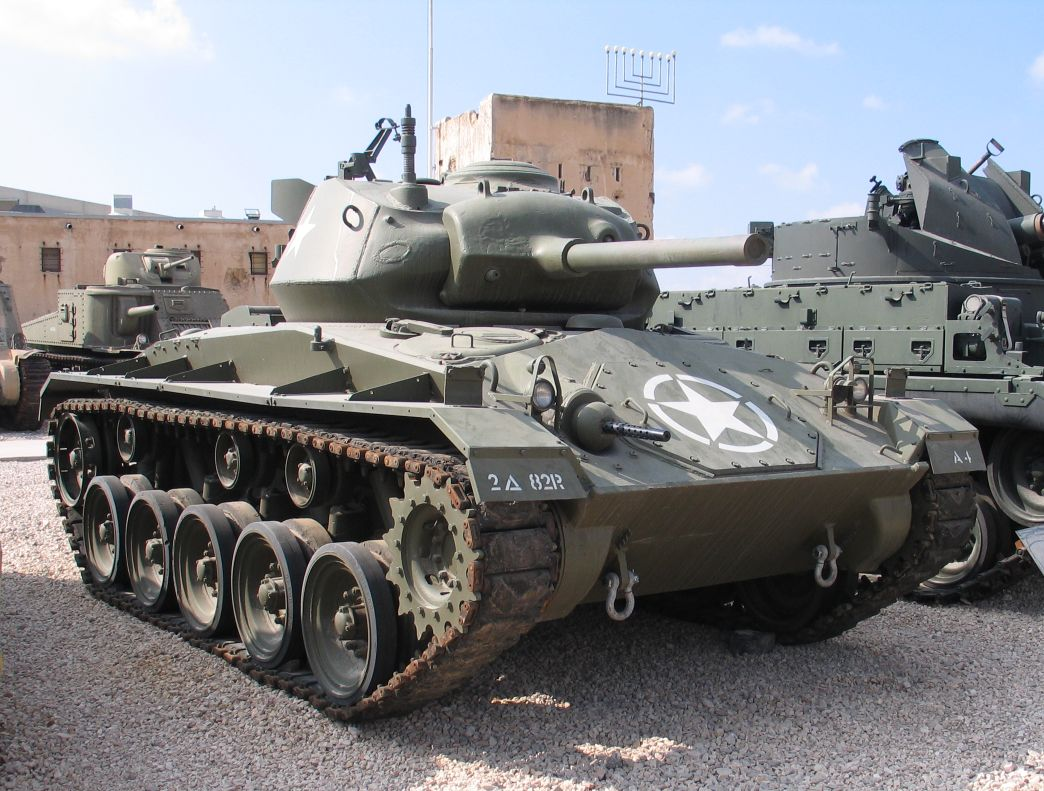
M24 Chaffee at the Yad La-Shiryon Museum, Israel

The M24 Chaffee was intended to replace the aging and obsolete light tank M5 (Stuart), which was used in supplementary roles. Crews liked the improved off-road performance and reliability, but were most appreciative of the 75 mm main gun, which was a vast improvement over the 37 mm. The M24's light armor made it vulnerable to enemy tanks, anti-tank guns, and hand-held anti-tank weapons.

In the Korean Conflict, M24s were the initial U.S. tanks directed to combat the North Korean T-34-85s. The occupation troops in Japan from which the tanks were drawn were inexperienced and under-equipped due to rapid demobilization after World War II. The M24 fared poorly against these better armed, better armored, and better crewed medium tanks, losing most of their number while inflicting only minor damage on the T-34 units. Managing a fighting withdrawal, they ended up as artillery in the Pusan Perimeter; in August reinforcements from the US and the Commonwealth brought heavier tanks that could easily dispatch the T-34s. M24s were more successful later in the war in their reconnaissance role, supported by heavier, more capable tanks such as the M4 Sherman, M26 Pershing, and M46 Patton.

==== M41 Walker Bulldog ====
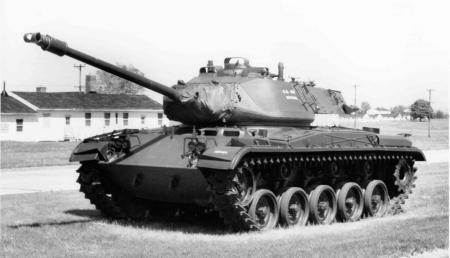
M41 Walker Bulldog

The development of the T37 began in 1947 to replace the M24 Chaffee. The vehicle was designed to be air-transportable, and with heavier firepower, provided by an advanced 76 mm gun. In 1949, with the adoption of a less ambitious rangefinder, the project's designation was changed to M41. Production started in 1951 at Cadillac's Cleveland Tank Plant, and by 1953 the new tank completely replaced the M24 in the United States Army. It was later designated the M41 Walker Bulldog. The M41 was agile and well armed. On the other hand, it was noisy, fuel-hungry and heavy enough to cause problems with air transport.

The Walker Bulldog saw limited combat with the U.S. Army during the Korean Conflict, but for the most part, the conflict served as a testing ground to work out the tank's deficiencies, especially with its rangefinder. At the time, it was designated as the T-41, and was rushed to the battlefield even before its first test run. This was due to the fact that the North Koreans were supplied with Soviet T-34 tanks, which were superior to the M24. It also was used in nearby Japan: by 1961, 150 were delivered to the Japan Ground Self-Defense Force to supplement their Type 61 medium tanks. It was also used in the Bay of Pigs conflict by the Brigade 2506, with the M41 Walker Bulldog tanks going against the Cuban T-34-85 tanks, with five T-34-85 tanks destroyed and others severely damaged.

=== Medium tanks ===
==== M4A3 ====
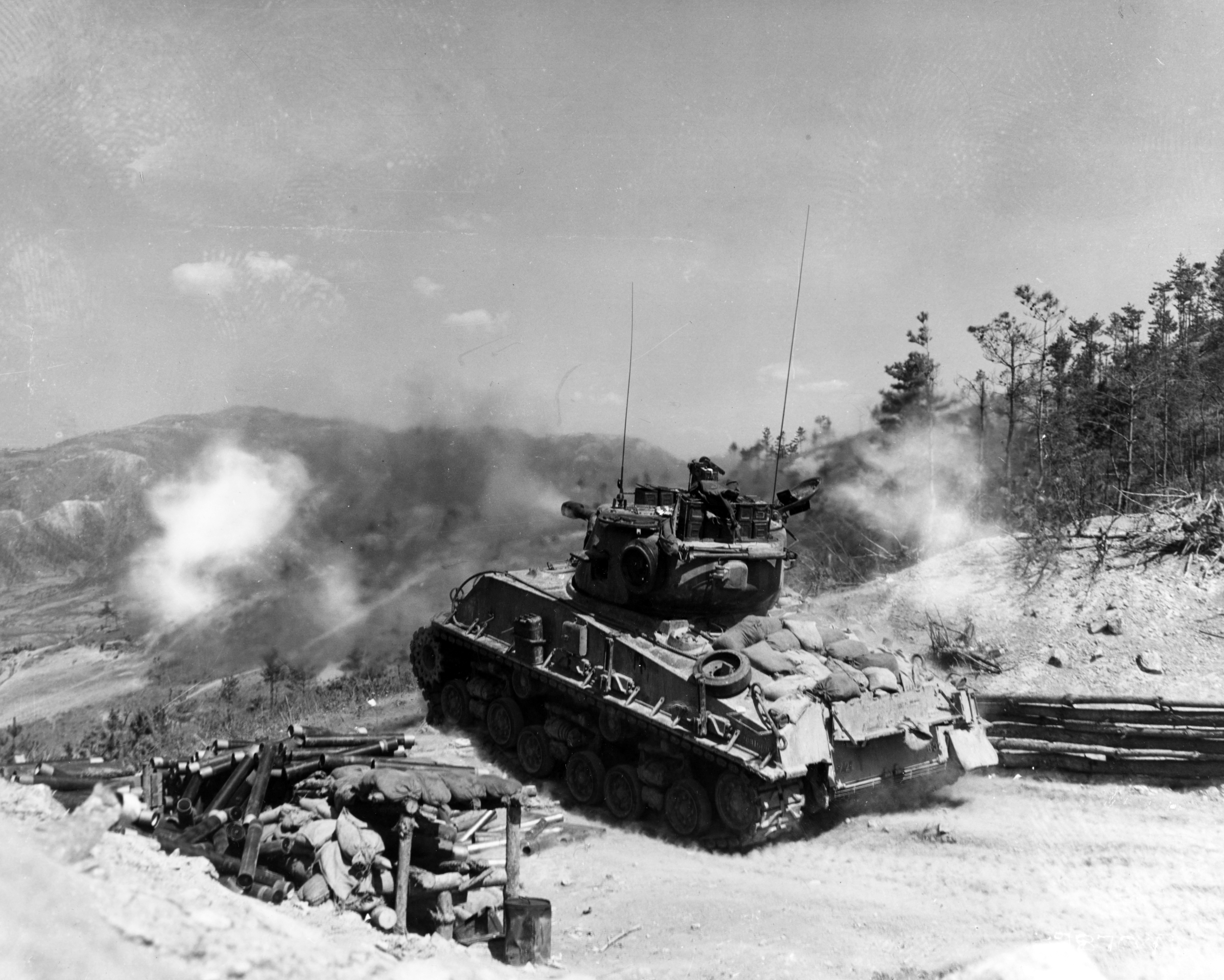
A M4A3(76)W HVSS Sherman used as artillery in firing position during the Korean War

The M4A3 was the last type of Sherman in U.S. service. It was roughly equal to the enemy T-34-85s and they could destroy each other at normal combat ranges. Later in the war, they were only used for artillery and reserves.

==== M26 Pershing ====
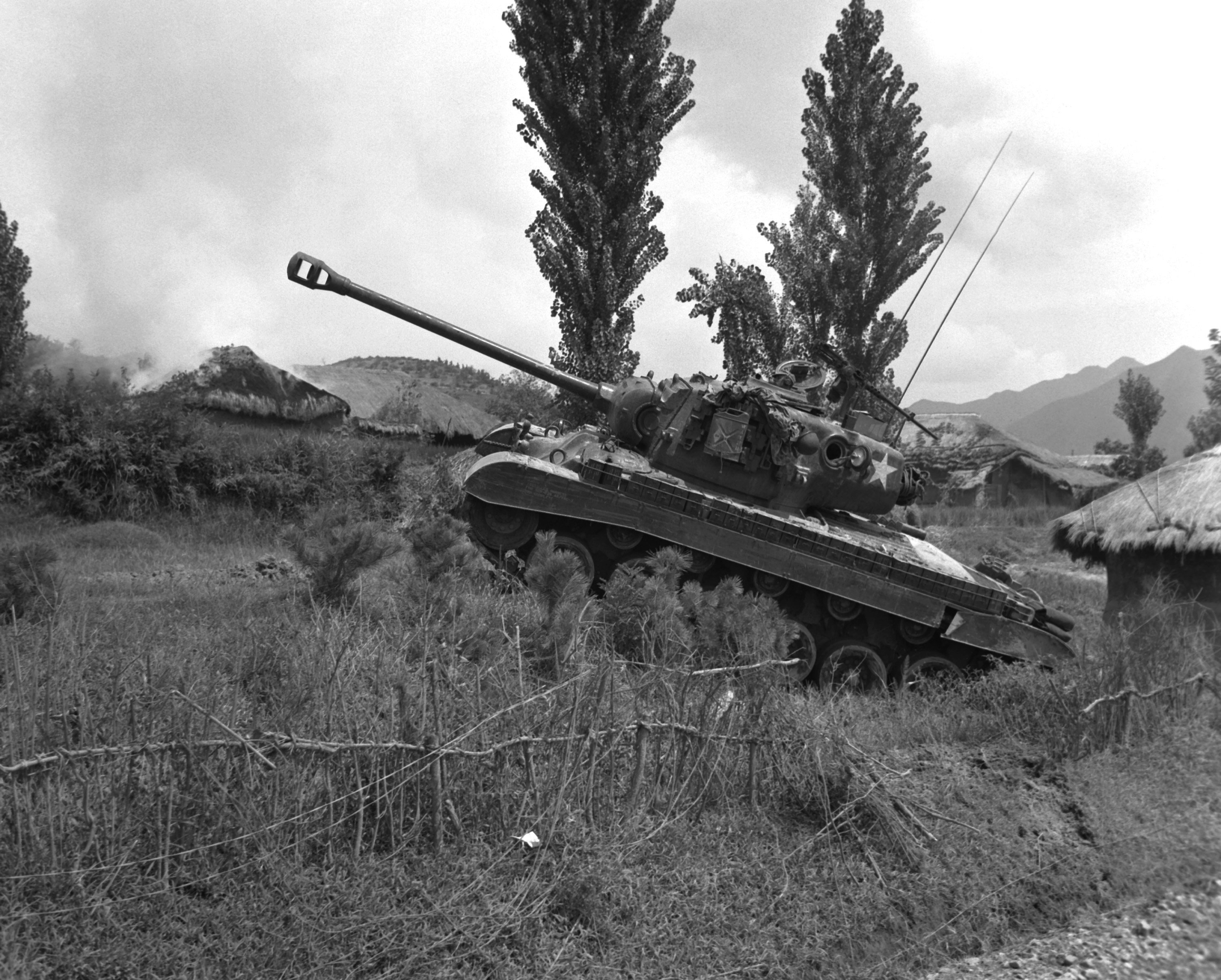
USMC M26 Pershing in Korea, 1950.

The M26 Pershing was named after General John J. Pershing who led the American Expeditionary Force in Europe in World War I. It was designed at the end of World War II, but saw little combat action due to its late introduction into service. Designed as a heavy tank, the Pershing was a significant upgrade from the M4 Sherman in terms of firepower with its 90 mm gun and protection. In May 1946, due to changing conceptions of the U.S. Army's tank needs, the M26 was reclassified as a medium tank. However, its mobility was unsatisfactory for a medium tank, due to the fact that it used the same engine that powered the M4A3, which was some ten tons lighter, and its transmission was somewhat unreliable. In 1948, the M26E2 version was developed with a new powerpack. The new version was redesignated as the M46 Patton and 1,160 M26s were rebuilt to this new standard.

The M26 Pershing would see large scale combat deployments in the Korean War.

==== M46 Patton ====
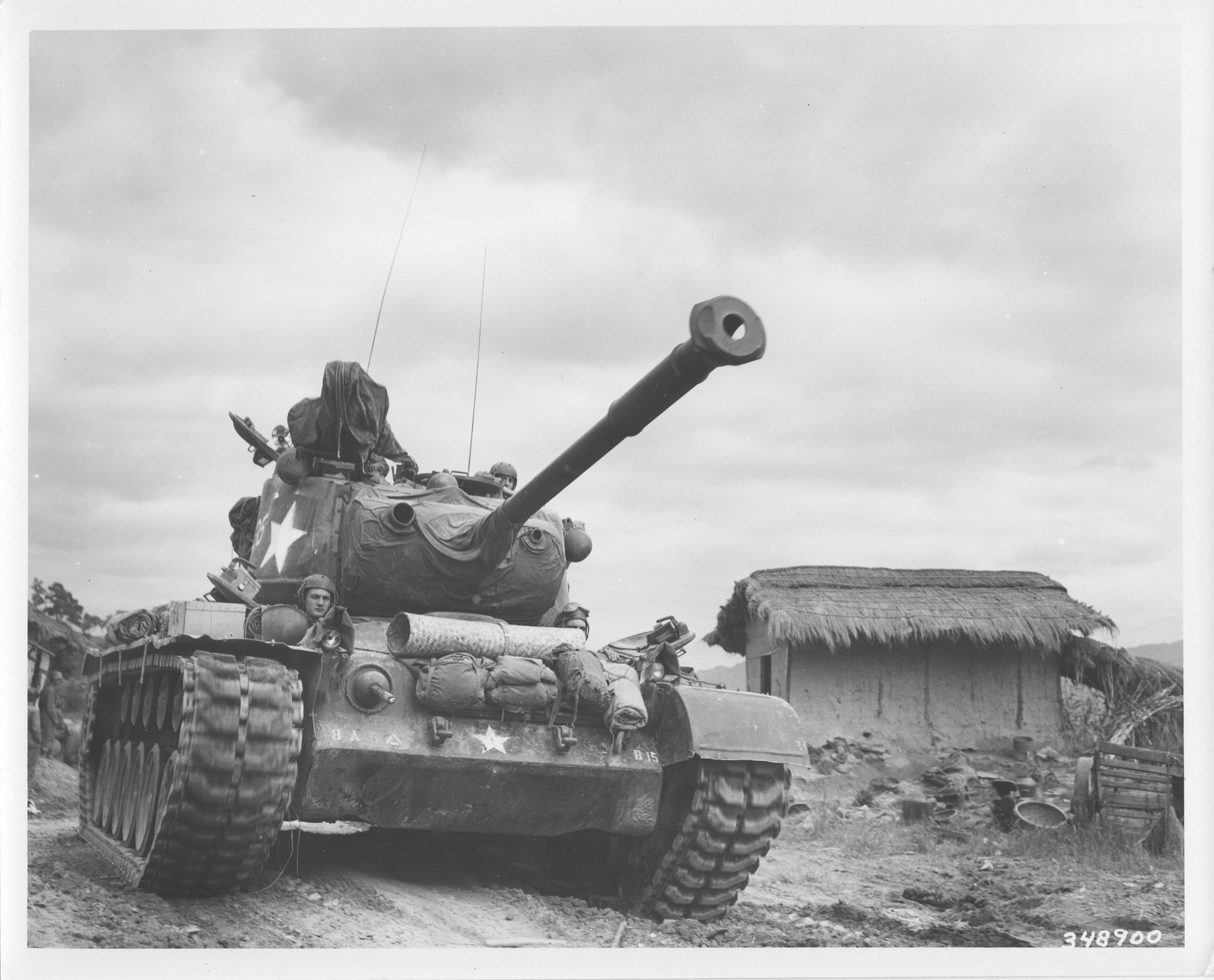
M46 Patton tank and crew passing through the village of Kumko, Korea, in September 1950.

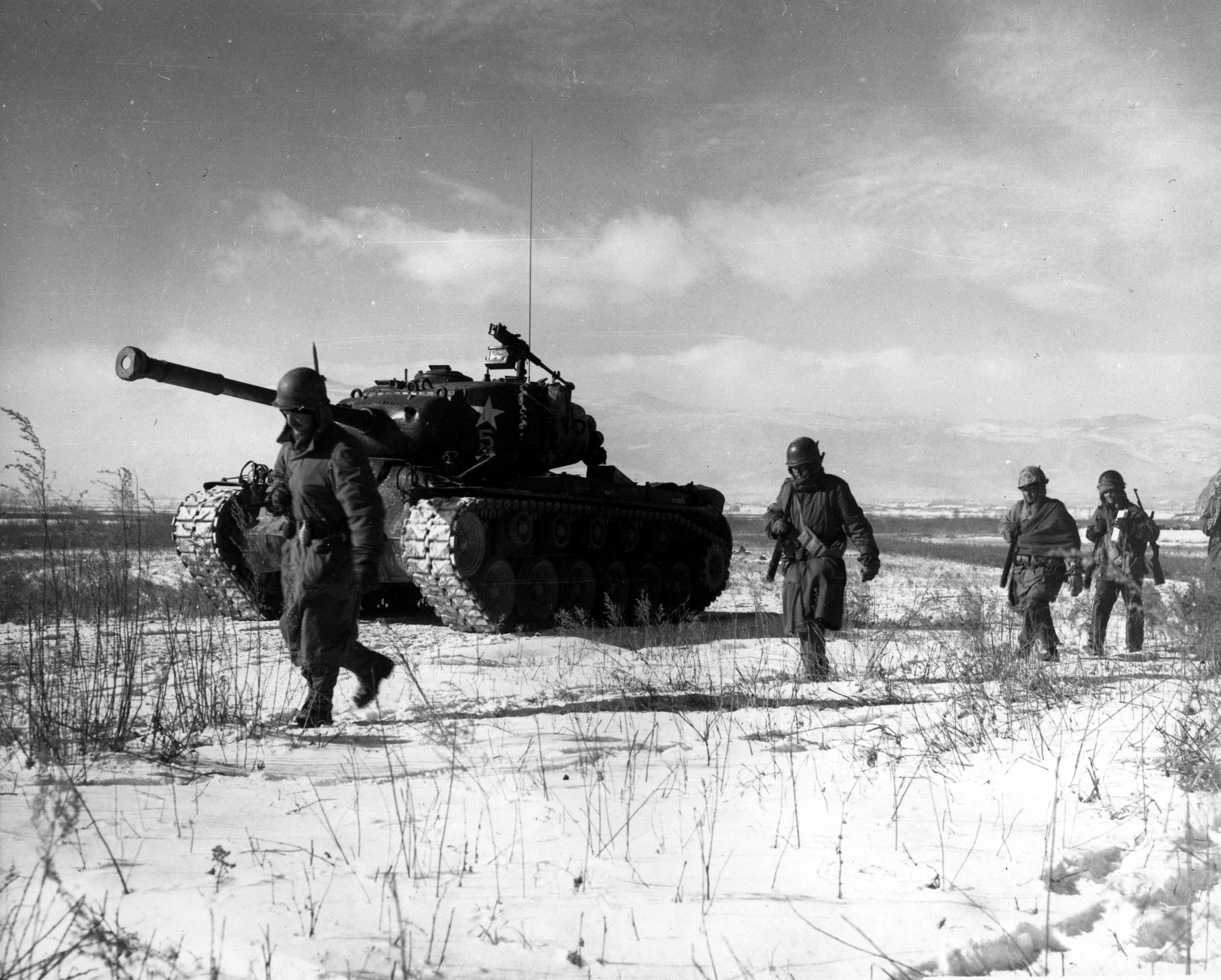
Marines of 1st Marine Division at the Battle of Chosin Reservoir supported by M46 Patton tank.

The mobility of the M26 Pershing was deemed unsatisfactory for a medium tank, as it added 10 tons of weight but used the same engine that powered the much lighter M4 Sherman.

Work began in 1948 on replacing the power plant in the M26 Pershing, with a more powerful engine and more reliable transmission. The Continental AV1790-3 was chosen which was capable of more than 800 hp compared to the previous engine in the M26 Pershing which was rated for only 500 hp, and was coupled with the cross-drive transmission Allison CD-850-1. Modifications continued to accumulate, and eventually the Bureau of Ordnance decided that the tank needed its own unique designation. When the rebuilding process began in November 1949, the upgraded M26 received a new power plant and a main gun with a bore evacuator, and the M46 Patton designation. Less than a thousand were upgraded to M46 standard.

The M46 Patton became a completely upgraded and modernized version of the M26 Pershing, and a total of 1,168 M46 tanks were manufactured between 1949 and 1951. On 8 August 1950 the first M46 Pattons were deployed to South Korea. The tank proved superior to the much lighter North Korean T-34-85, which were encountered in relatively small numbers. By the end of 1950, 200 M46 Pattons had been fielded, forming about 15% of US tank strength in Korea; the balance of 1,326 tanks shipped to Korea during 1950 included 679 M4A3 Shermans, 309 M26 Pershings, and 138 M24 Chaffee light tanks.

The M46 Patton was slower compared to other medium tank counterparts, but its maneuverability and powerful 90 mm gun made it a formidable weapon in the Korean Conflict.

Subsequent shipments of M46 and M46A1 Pattons meant all remaining M26 Pershings were withdrawn during 1951, and most Sherman equipped units were also reequipped with the newer models of tanks.

=== Post-Korean War ===
==== Medium tanks ====
===== M47 Patton =====
The M47 Patton was intended to replace the M46 Patton and M4 Sherman tanks. It had a 90 mm gun and a crew of five. Although it was the primary tank of the US, it never saw combat while in US service.

===== M48 Patton =====
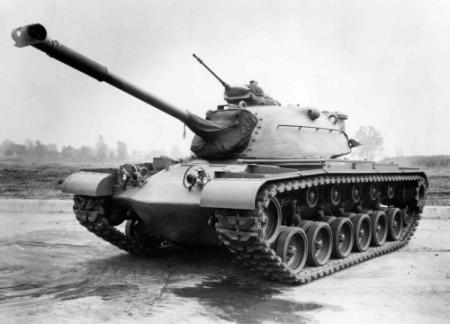
M48A1

In early 1951, the U.S. initiated the design of the M48 Patton, designated the T-48 during its prototype stage, with a 90 mm cannon. The T48 featured a new turret, an improved suspension, and a redesigned hull in which the drive was to be seated in a centerline position, which also eliminated the bow machine gun as well as its operator. When the bow machine gunner position was removed, the M48 Patton became the first U.S. medium gun tank to have a centerline tank driver, no bow machine gun, and a 4-man crew. This contrasts all preceding tank designs, which had 5 or more crewmen per tank and the driver was off-set left or right at the front.

===== T95 medium tank =====
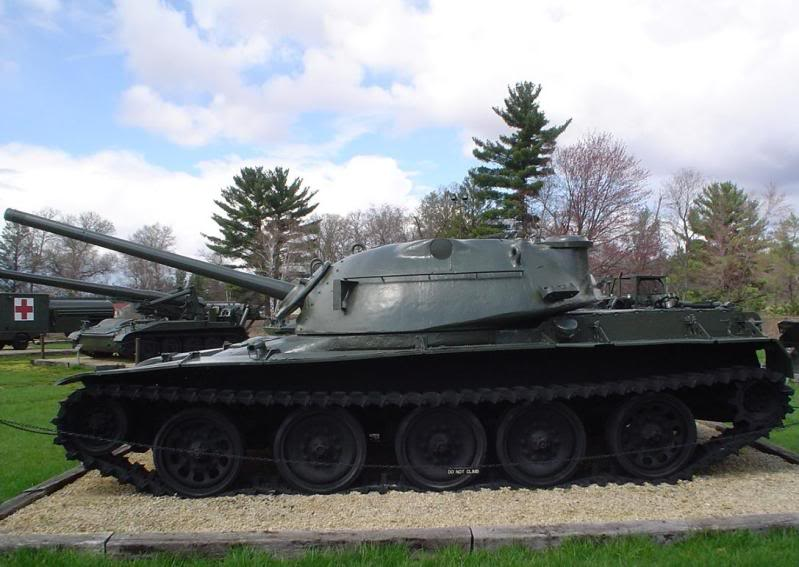
T95 medium tank

The T95 was an American series of prototype medium tanks developed from 1955 to 1959. These tanks used many advanced or unusual features, such as siliceous-cored armor, the APFSDS-firing 90 mm T208 smoothbore gun in a rigid mounting without a recoil system, a new transmission, and fire-control system, which incorporated the T53 Optical Tracking, Acquisition and Ranging (OPTAR) system, which worked by emitting pulsed beams of intense incoherent infrared light.

==== Heavy tanks ====
===== M103 heavy tank =====
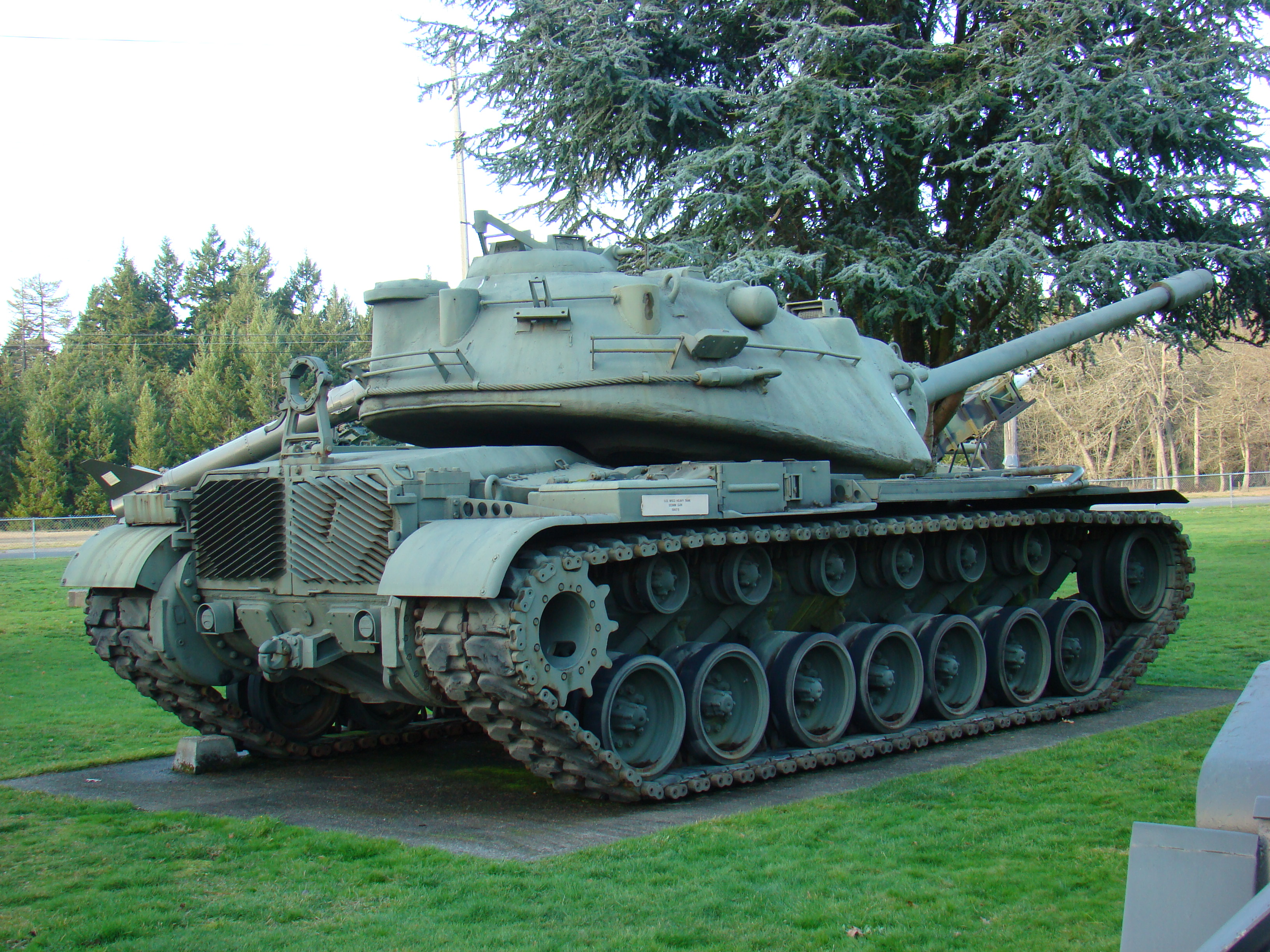
M103 at JBLM

The M103 was manufactured at the Detroit Arsenal Tank Plant and the first units were accepted into service in 1957.

The M103 was designed to counter Soviet heavy tanks. Its long-ranged 120 mm cannon was designed to hit enemy tanks at extreme distances, but it was never used in combat. Of the 300 M103s built, most went to the Marine Corps. The tank was relatively underpowered and the drive systems were fragile.

The turret of the M103 was larger than that of the M48 or the M60 to make room for the huge 120 mm gun and the two loaders assigned to it, in addition to the gunner and the commander. The driver sat in the hull. The gun was capable of elevation from +15 to -8 degrees.

While the US Army deactivated its heavy armor units with the reception of the new M60 series main battle tanks in 1960, the remaining M103s stayed within the US Marine Corps inventory until they began receiving the M60 series main battle tank. With the disappearance of the heavy tank from US forces came the full acceptance of the main battle tank in 1960 in the U.S. Army, and in 1973 in the U.S. Marine Corps.

=== Vietnam War ===
==== Light tanks ====
===== M551 Sheridan =====
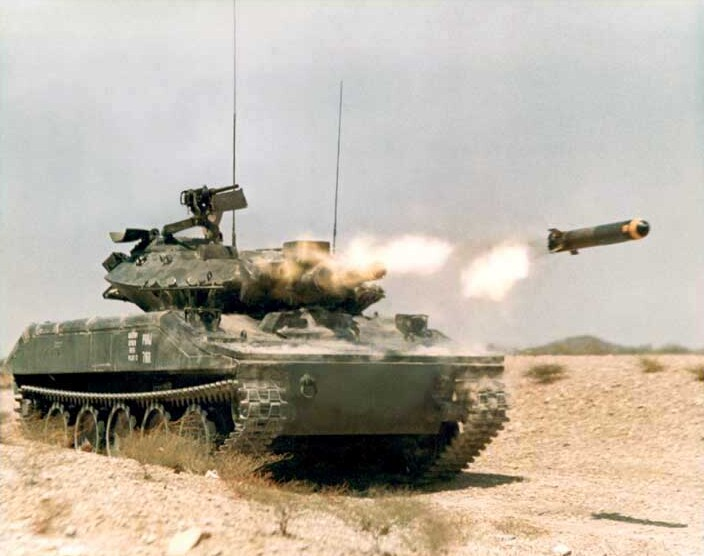
An XM551 Sheridan firing a Shillelagh missile

The design of the M551 Sheridan was initiated when the replacement for the M41, the T92 Light Tank, was canceled.

The need for even lighter weight than the T-92 presented the design with a difficult problem: guns capable of defeating modern tanks at reasonable ranges were so large that they demanded a large vehicle to carry them, to the point where the vehicle would be unable to fulfill its intended doctrinal use as a light tank. The use of HEAT rounds instead of conventional penetrating ammunition could address this, but HEAT rounds work better with larger calibers. Firepower on tank cannons is typically the product of caliber and muzzle velocity, so in the case of the XM551 muzzle velocity was sacrificed, producing the low-velocity but relatively large-caliber 152 mm M81. HEAT rounds fired by the M81 could defeat any contemporary tank at shorter ranges, but its low velocity made it difficult to use at longer ranges, especially against moving targets. The large low-velocity gun was also ideal for infantry support, where higher performance anti-tank guns would often fire right through soft targets and their small-caliber guns left little room for explosive filler. The M81 would thus be ideal for both direct fire support as well as short-distance anti-tank engagements.

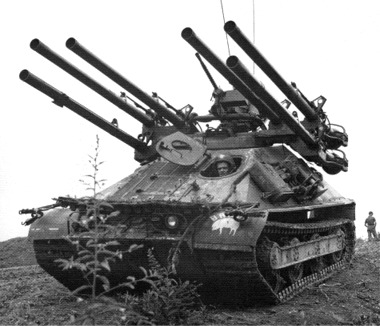
A US Ontos M50A1 tank destroyer. The .50 caliber spotting rifles can be seen on the upper guns.

The performance of the M81 gun was deficient in the medium and long-range anti-tank engagement. The muzzle velocity was so low that a HEAT round fired at longer ranges would have to be "lofted", making aiming difficult, and the flight time would be so long that a moving target would be very difficult to hit. However, it appeared there was a solution to this problem by equipping the tank with gun-fired anti-tank missiles. For longer range engagements a missile would be fired instead of a HEAT round, and although its velocity would also be relatively slow, the guidance system would make a hit highly likely. A number of vehicles mounting only ATGM's, or alternately recoilless rifles like the US's own Ontos tank were already in service, but typically these vehicles had limited firepower in the infantry support role, or in the case of Ontos, could not be reloaded from within the vehicle. The XM551 offered a compelling compromise: for infantry support, the large caliber gun allowed it to fire full-sized artillery rounds and canister shot, while also giving it reasonable short-range anti-tank performance from the same gun. Although the Shillelagh missile was considered a risky project, if it worked, the XM551 would be able to deal with even the largest tanks at extreme ranges.

The vehicle designed to mount the gun had a steel turret and aluminum hull. It was powered by a large diesel engine. The M551 thus had excellent mobility, able to run at speeds up to 45 mph. Amphibious capability was provided by a flotation screen. Production started on late July 1966, and entered service in June 1967. More than 1,600 M551s were built between 1966 and 1970. Total cost of the M551 program was $1.3 billion.

The vehicle proved to be very noisy and unreliable under combat conditions. The armor was thin enough that it could be penetrated even by heavy machine gun rounds as well as being highly vulnerable to mines.

Firing the gun would often adversely affect the delicate electronics, which were at the early stages of transitioning to solid state, so the missile and guidance system was omitted from vehicles deployed to Vietnam. Thus, despite the production of 88,000 of the expensive missiles, few were ever used in combat. The gun had problems with cracks developing near the breech after repeated firing. Most field units were modified to help address the problem and the modified M81E1 was introduced with a shallower slot, along with a matching modification to the missile, that solved the problem. The gun also has been criticized for having too much recoil for the vehicle weight, with the second and even third road wheels coming clear off the ground when the main gun fired.

The Sheridan saw extensive action in the Vietnam War, being assigned to nearly all armored cavalry squadrons in the country. In 1969, armored cavalry units began replacing their M48 Patton tanks.

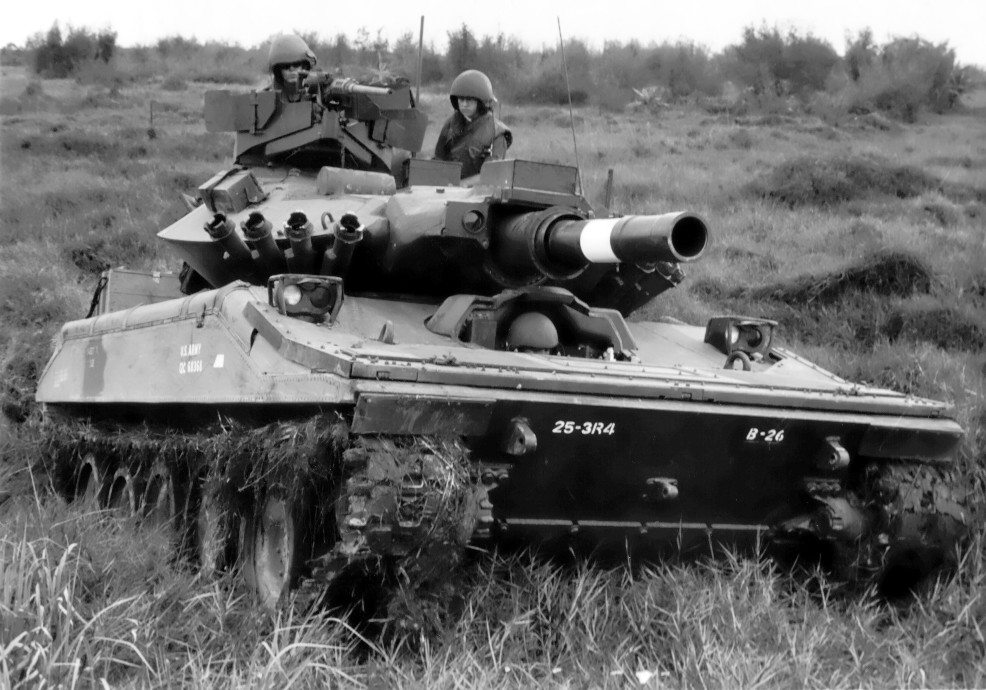
An M551 Sheridan and crew of the 3rd Squadron, 4th Armored Cavalry in Vietnam.

The battle reports from the troops were sometimes glowing, while the reports higher up the chain of command were often negative. A 1969 evaluation of the vehicles found the M551 was employed in reconnaissance, night patrol and road clearing, accumulating 39,455 road miles and 520 combat missions, with a ready rate of 81.3 percent. Despite vulnerability to rockets and mines, it was judged worth applying modifications and equip all cavalry squadrons with the Sheridan.

The Sheridan was much appreciated by the infantry who were desperate for direct-fire support, which generally served in combination with ACAVs (M113s) as armored cavalry units, consisting of both M113s and M551s as part of their TO&E. Armor units consisted solely of tanks (minus the headquarters company) and Mechanized Infantry units consisted solely of M113s. In this role the real problem with the Sheridan was its limited ammunition load of only 20 rounds and 8 missiles (though M551s in Vietnam service were not equipped with missiles or their guidance equipment, increasing the basic load of conventional rounds).

A common field-modification was to mount a large steel shield, known as an "ACAV set" (Armored Cavalry Assault Vehicle), around the commander's .50 caliber (12.7 mm) gun, allowing it to be fired with some level of protection. The driver has an unusual rotating hatch which has vision blocks when rotated forward. Included with the set was an extra layer of steel belly armor which was bolted onto the vehicle's bottom, although only covering from the front to halfway to the end, possibly due to weight reasons.

A standard modification made during the mid-1970s was the addition of the "Cereal Bowl" commander's cupola. This modification came about due to the broken rib effect that occurred when the Sheridan fired conventional rounds: the recoil would pitch the TC against the armor plating, resulting in cracked ribs on the crew-members.

==== Medium tanks ====
===== M48 Patton =====
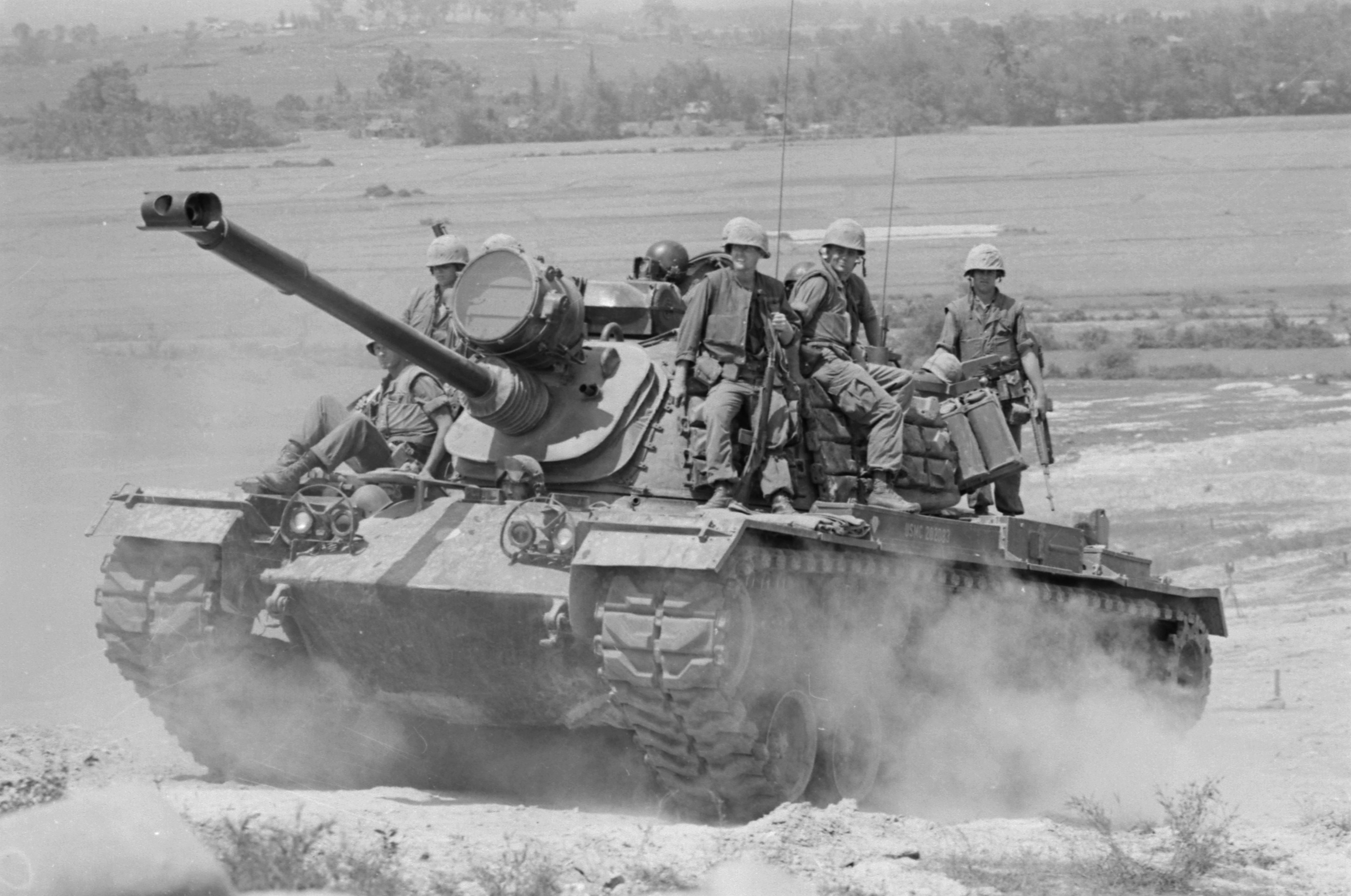
Marines of E Company, 2nd Battalion, 3rd Marines, riding on an M48A3 tank, Vietnam, 1966

The M48s saw extensive action during the Vietnam War: over 600 Pattons would be deployed with US Forces during the war. The initial M48s landed with the US Marines in 1965. The remaining Pattons deployed to South Vietnam were in three U.S. Army battalions: the 177th Armor near the DMZ, the 169th Armor in the Central Highlands, and the 234th Armor near the Mekong Delta. Each battalion consisted of approximately fifty seven tanks. M48s were also used by Armored Cavalry Squadrons in Vietnam, until replaced by M551 Sheridan tanks. The M67A1 flamethrower tank (nicknamed the Zippo) was an M48 variant also used in the conflict.

When US forces commenced redeployment operations, many of the M48A3 Pattons were turned over to the Army of the Republic of Vietnam (ARVN) forces, in particular creating the ARVN 20th Tank Regiment, which supplemented their M41 Walker Bulldog units. During the North Vietnamese Army (NVA) Easter Offensive in 1972, tank clashes between NVA T-54/PT-76 and ARVN M48/M41 units became commonplace, but on 23 April 1972, tankers of the 20th Tank Regiment were attacked by an NVA infantry-tank team, which was equipped with the new 9M14M Malyutka (NATO designation: Sagger) wire guided anti-tank missile.

Men of Troop B, 1st Squadron, 10th Cavalry Regiment, 4th Infantry Division, and their M48 Patton tank move through the jungle in the Central Highlands of Vietnam, June 1969.

During this battle, one M48A3 Patton tank and one M113 Armored Cavalry Assault Vehicle (ACAV) were destroyed, becoming the first losses to the Sagger missile; losses that would echo on an even larger scale a year later during the Yom Kippur War in the Middle East in 1973.

The M48s performed admirably in Vietnam in the infantry-support role. However, there were few actual tank versus tank battles. The M48s provided adequate protection for its crew from small arms, mines, and rocket-propelled grenades.

In the mid-1970s, the M48A5 upgrade was developed to allow the vehicle to carry a heavier 105 mm gun. This was designed to bring the M48s up to standard with the M60 tanks then in regular use. Most of the M48s were placed into service with reserve units by this time. By the mid-1990s, all M48s were phased out.

==== Main battle tanks ====
===== M60 =====
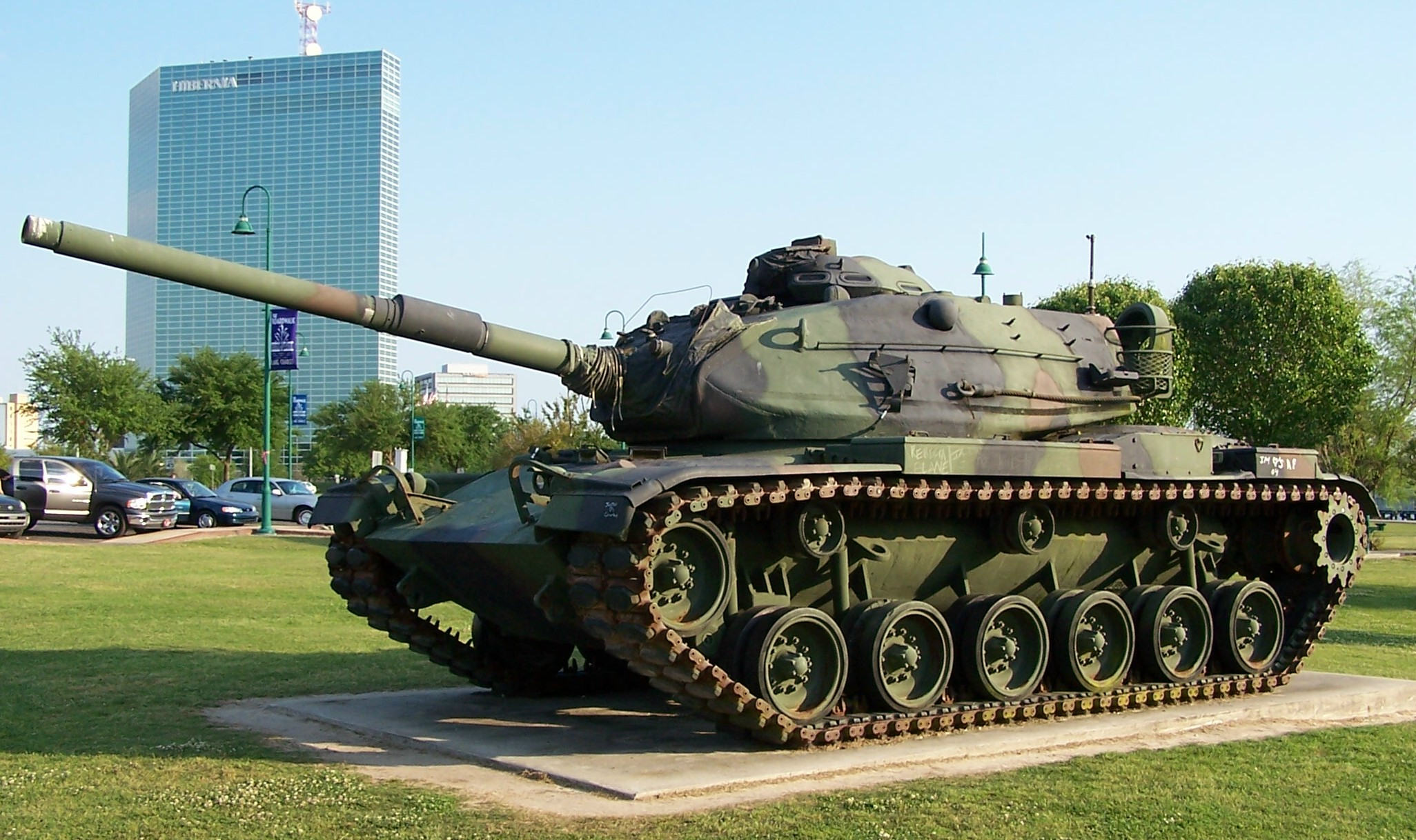
M60A3

The M60 tank was designed as a replacement for the M48 Patton and is based on a modified M48 hull.

In 1957, plans were laid in the US for a tank with a 105 mm main gun and a redesigned hull, offering better armor protection.

The resulting M60 largely resembled the M48 it was based on, but has significant differences: the M60 mounted a bore evacuated 105 mm main gun, had a hull with a straight front slope whereas the M48's hull was rounded, had three support rollers per side to the M48's five, and had road wheels constructed from aluminum rather than steel.

The hull of the M60 was a single piece steel casting divided into three compartments, with the driver in front, the fighting compartment in the middle, and the engine at the rear. The driver looked through three M27 day periscopes, one of which could be replaced by a night vision periscope. Initially, the M60 had essentially the same turret shape as the M48, but this was subsequently replaced with a distinctive "needlenose" design that minimized frontal cross-section to enemy fire.

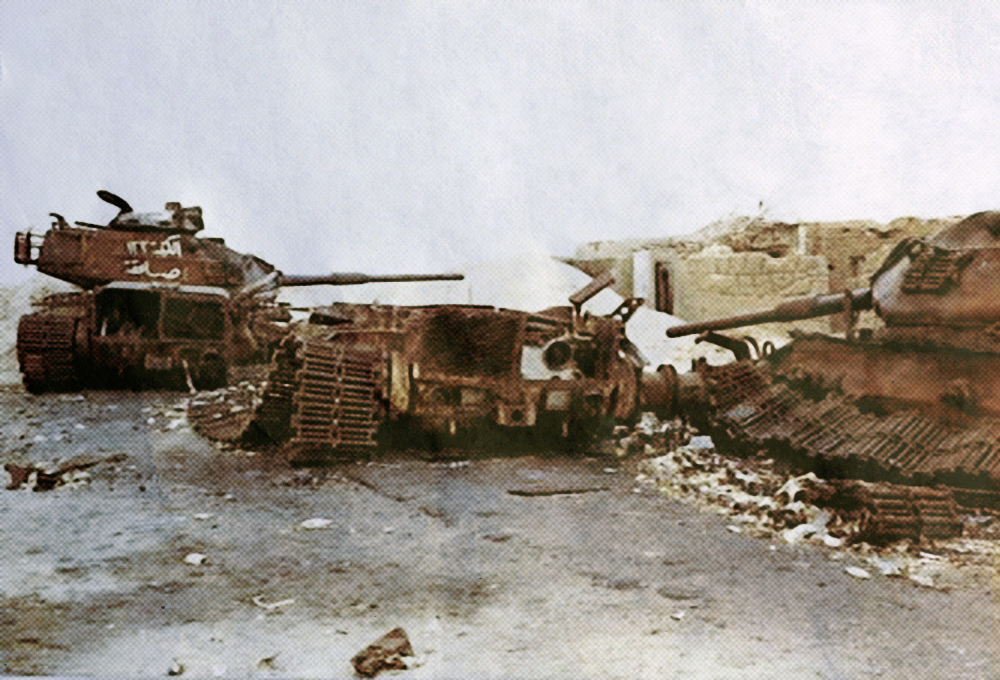
Destroyed Israeli Pattons during Yom Kippur War

The M60 was the last U.S. main battle tank to utilize homogeneous steel armor for protection. It was also the last to feature either the M60 machine gun or an escape hatch under the hull.

Originally designated the M68, the new vehicle was put into production in 1959, reclassified as the M60, and entered service in 1960. Over 15,000 M60s (across all variants) were constructed.

===== M60A1 =====
In 1963, the M60 was upgraded to the M60A1. This new variant, which stayed in production until 1980, featured a larger, better-shaped turret and improvements to the armor protection and shock absorbers. The M60A1 was also equipped with a stabilization system for the main gun. However, the M60A1 was still not able to fire on the move, as the system only kept the gun pointed in the same general direction while the tank was traveling cross country. It did however enable the coaxial machine gun to be brought to bear while moving.

=== Post-Vietnam ===
==== Light tanks ====
===== M551 Sheridan =====
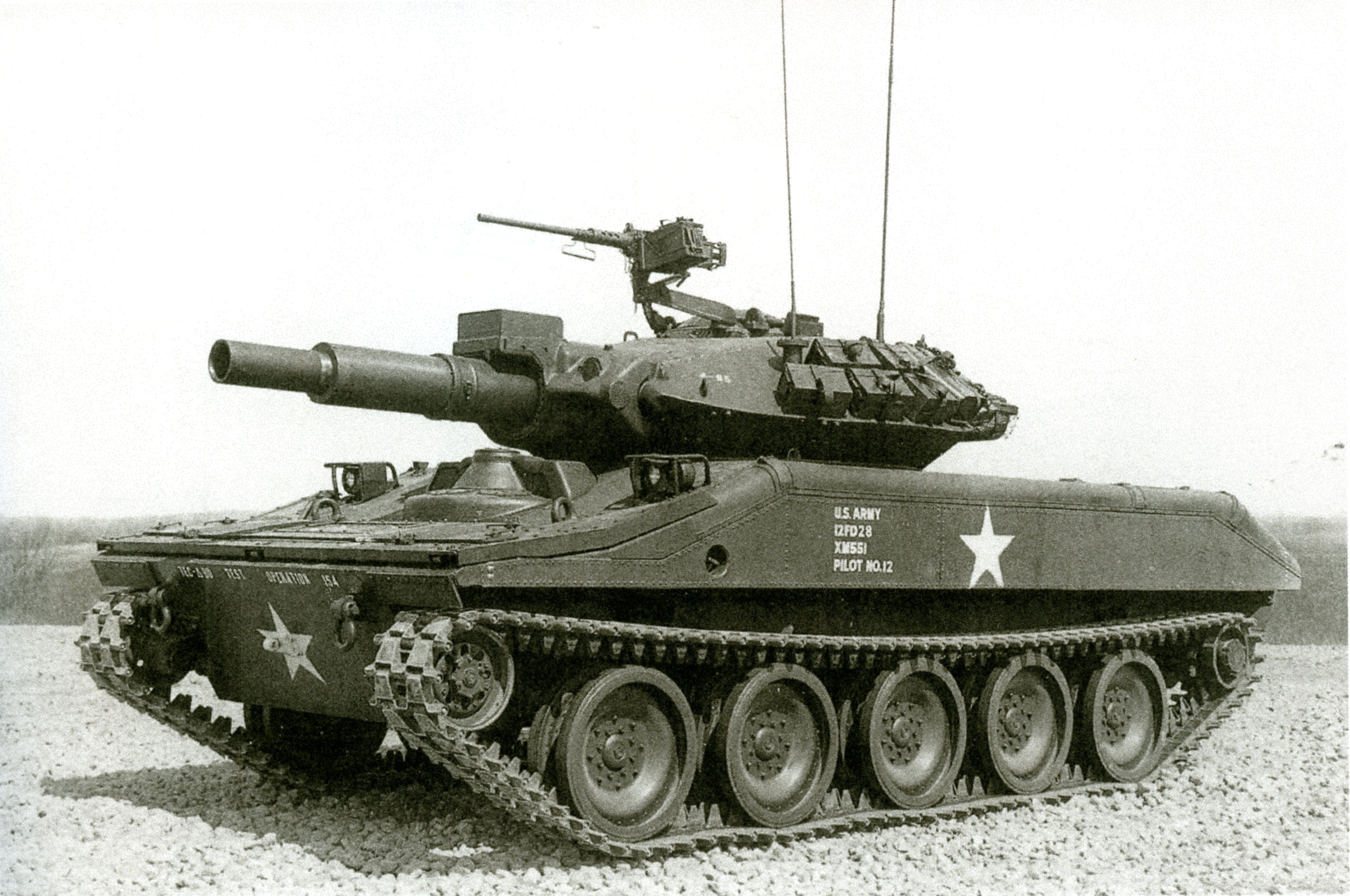
XM551 "Sheridan"

The Army reclassified their armor (tanks) in 1950 from heavy, medium, and light tanks to 120mm, 90mm and 76mm gun tanks, etc. Consequently, when the M551 Sheridan entered combat in Vietnam in January 1969, it was assigned to strictly cavalry units, and was classified as an Armored Reconnaissance Airborne Assault Vehicle M551 and not a light tank. The last official U.S. light tank in service was the M41 Walker Bulldog, and that vehicle was never used in combat by U.S. forces; being transferred to Army South Vietnamese forces (ARVN) and U.S. Army Guard/Reserve forces until being phased out of general service, excepting special service units: Airborne, OPFOR (Opposing Force-Training), Ft. Irwin, etc. Airborne units began to phase out the Sheridan in 1978, although at the time there was no real replacement. Nevertheless, the 82nd Airborne were able to keep them on until 1996. The Sheridan was the only air-deployable tank in the inventory, and as such they had considerably more "pull" than non-airborne units who were forced to get rid of them. Their units were later upgraded to the M551A1 model, including a thermal sighting system for the commander and gunner.

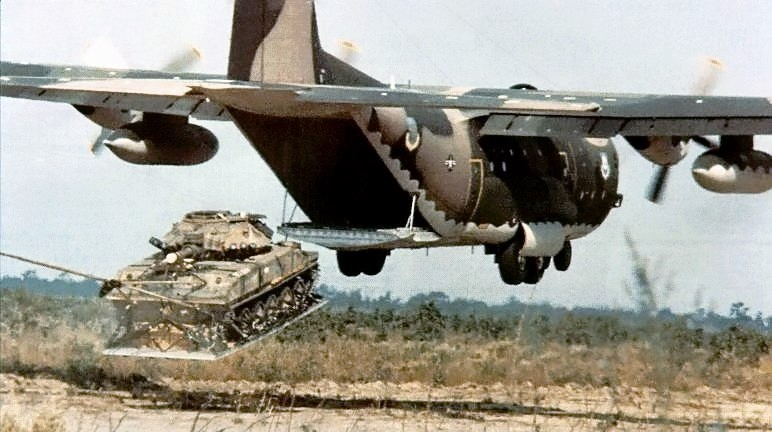
A C-130 delivering an M551 Sheridan tank using LAPES (Low Altitude Parachute Extraction System).

The Sheridan's only air drop in combat occurred during Operation Just Cause in Panama in 1989, when fourteen M551's were deployed; four were transported by C-5 Galaxies and ten were dropped by air, but two Sheridans were destroyed upon landing. The Sheridans' performance received mixed reviews. They were lauded by their operators and some commanders as providing firepower in situations which needed to destroy hard targets. However, the Sheridans' employment of only HEAT rounds limited their effectiveness against reinforced concrete construction.

51 Sheridans were deployed in the Gulf War as some of the first tanks sent. They would not be very effective against the Russian-built T-72s. Their role was limited by age and light armor to reconnaissance, possibly 6 or fewer Shillelagh missiles were test fired at empty Iraqi bunkers. These few missiles, less than a half-dozen of the 88,000 produced, were the only Shillelaghs fired in a combat environment. ( 3-73 ARMOR destroyed a ZSU-57-2 in the Gulf War with a Shillelagh ATGM . It was fired by 2LT Clint Sanders, a Citadel Graduate. He never received recognition from the armory community, I suggested an Order of Saint George but the BN CDR (Levine) refused it because he was leaving the army after his first tour. Clint was a fine officer, a warrior. He should be recognized. PS The Shillelagh misssile worked as advertised. Carved a canyon in the T-54/55 based Anti aircraft system. It would be very deadly with auto cannons, 57mm vs Sheridan armor. He saved his crew and many others with that engagement.

Several attempts to up-gun or replace the Sheridan have been made, but none were successful. Several experimental versions of the Sheridan mounting a new turret carrying a 105 mm gun were made. The U.S. Army sought to replace the M8 armored gun system, but this was canceled in 1996. The Sheridan was retired without a replacement until the M1128 mobile gun system (MGS) came online. The MGS never reached its potential after a protracted procurement effort, and was retired in 2022. The U.S. Army's current light tank procurement program is Mobile Protected Firepower.

==== Main battle tanks ====
===== M60A2 =====
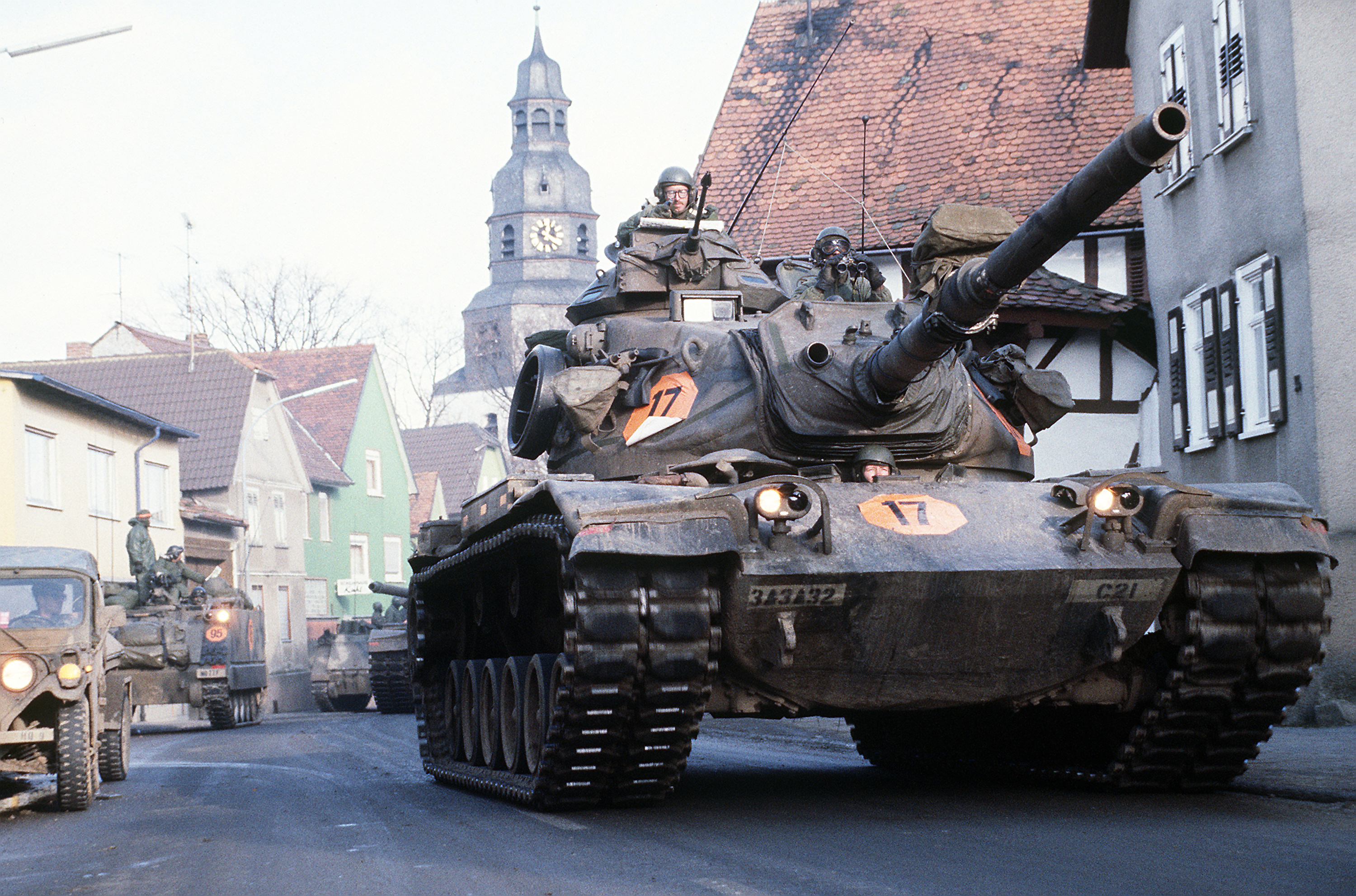
M60A3 main battle tank of the 3rd Armored Division, 3-32nd Armored Regt, moves along a street in Germany during Exercise REFORGER '85.

The M60A2, nicknamed the "Starship" due to its Space Age technology, featured an entirely new low-profile turret with a commander's machine-gun cupola on top, giving the commander a good view and field of fire while under armor but spoiling the low profile. It also featured a 152 mm cannon, which fired conventional rounds as well as guided missiles.

The M60A2 proved a disappointment, though technical advancements would pave the way for future tanks. The Shillelagh/M60A2 system was phased out from active units by 1981, and the turrets scrapped. Most of the M60A2 tanks were rebuilt as M60A3.

===== M60A3 =====
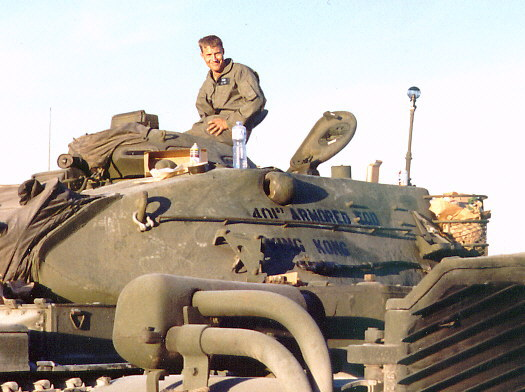
A 401st TFW (P) M60A3 tank seen at Doha, Qatar during the 1991 Gulf War

The development of the M60A2 with a new turret fitted with a 152mm gun was stopped and in 1978, work began on the M60A3 variant. It featured a number of technological enhancements, including smoke dischargers, a new rangefinder, and M21 ballistic computer, and a turret stabilization system. In addition, it reverted to the M68A1 105 mm cannon. All active American Army M60s eventually underwent the conversion to the A3 model. The M60A3 main battle tanks of the US Army were deployed in Operation Desert Storm in 1991 during the Gulf Crisis.

The M60A3 was phased out of US service in 1997 and was replaced by the M1 Abrams main battle tank.

===== MBT-70 =====
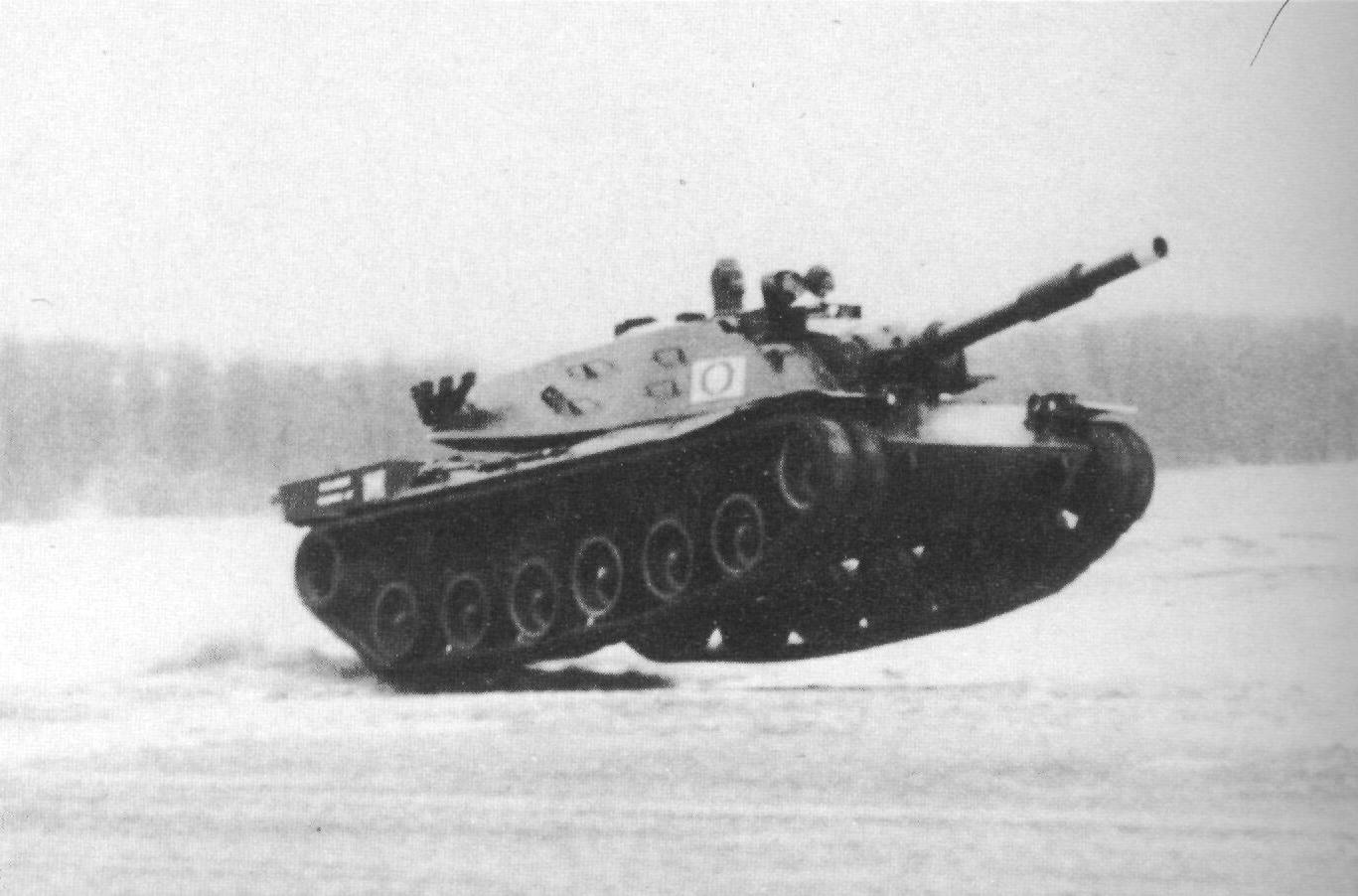
MBT-70 prototype at Aberdeen Proving Ground undergoing speed tests

The MBT-70 (German: KPz 70) was an American–West German joint project to develop a new main battle tank during the 1960s.

The MBT-70 was developed by the United States and West Germany in the context of the Cold War, intended to counter the new generation of Warsaw Pact tanks developed by the Soviet Union. The new tank was to be equipped with a number of advanced features such as newly developed "kneeling" hydropneumatic suspension and housing the entire crew in the large turret, and was armed with a 152mm XM150 gun/launcher, which could use conventional ammunition and the Shillelagh missile for long range combat.

By the late 1960s, the development of the MBT-70 was well over budget and affected by design issues. West Germany withdrew from the project due to costs and a new difference in requirements. The United States continued development of the MBT-70 until 1971 when the program was finally cancelled. West Germany independently developed the Leopard 2 as its new main battle tank.

===== M1 Abrams =====
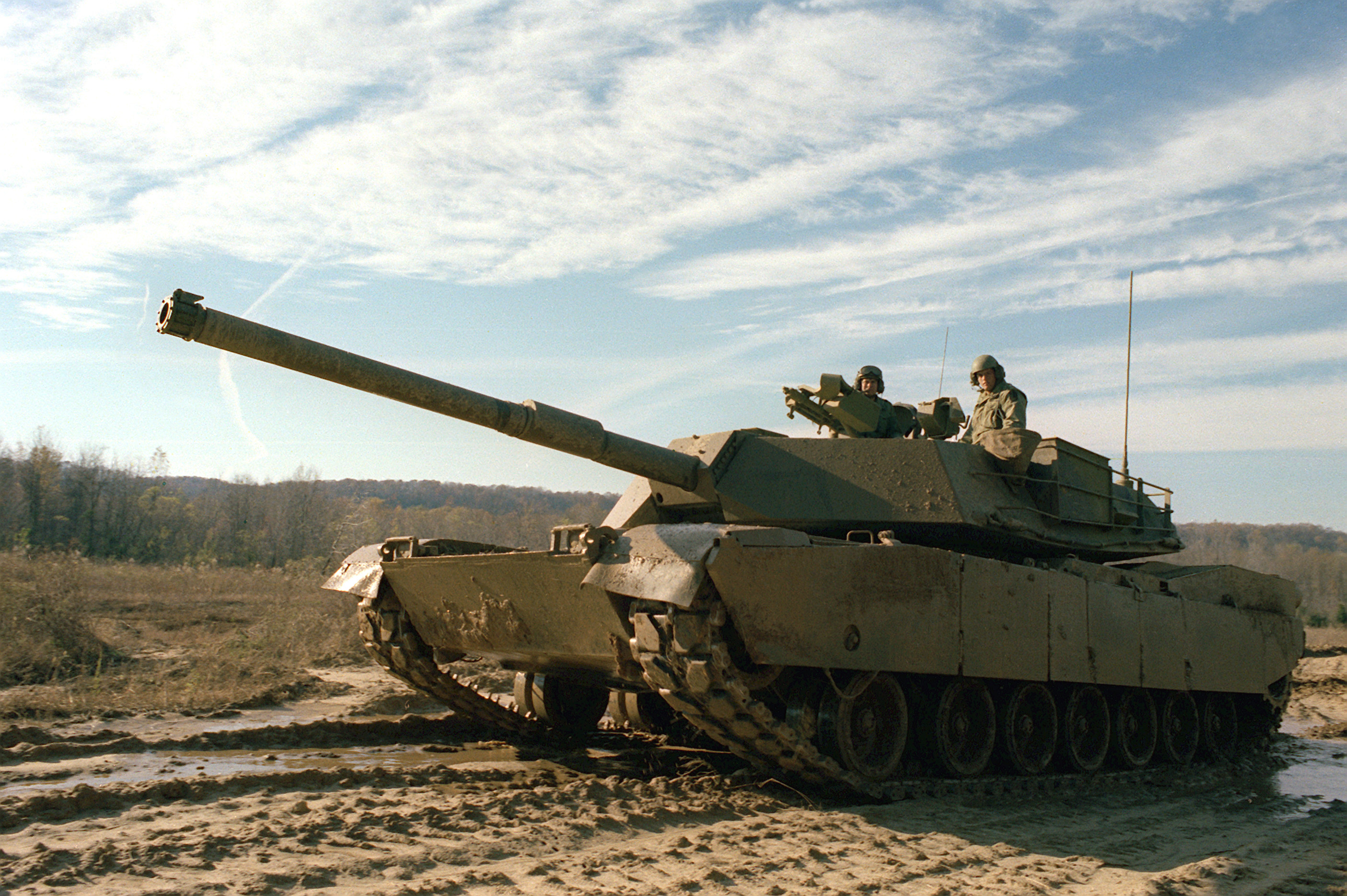
An XM1 Abrams, during a demonstration at Fort Knox, Kentucky in 1979

The M1 Abrams came from the diverted funds from the over budget and impractical MBT-70 and XM815 projects.

Prototypes were delivered in 1976 by Chrysler Defense and General Motors armed with a license-built 105 mm rifled cannon. The Chrysler Defense design was selected for development as the M1. In 1979, General Dynamics Land Systems Division purchased Chrysler Defense. The M1 was the first of its kind. It featured a low profile turret and for the first time ever on a tank, composite chobham armor. Despite all these advances, the Abrams still retained the 4-man crew of the M60 tank as the autoloader was considered unproven and risky.

Over 3,200 M1 Abrams were produced and first entered US Army service in 1980.

About 6,000 upgraded M1A1 Abrams were produced and used a 120 mm smoothbore cannon, improved armor, and a CBRN protection system.

Since the Cold War the U.S. has moved away almost completely from using light tanks; instead supplementing these with heavily armed armored cars. The M60A1/(A3 For Army) tank continued in service with the Marines and saw action in the Gulf War.

== Iraq Conflict ==
=== Persian Gulf War ===
==== M60 ====
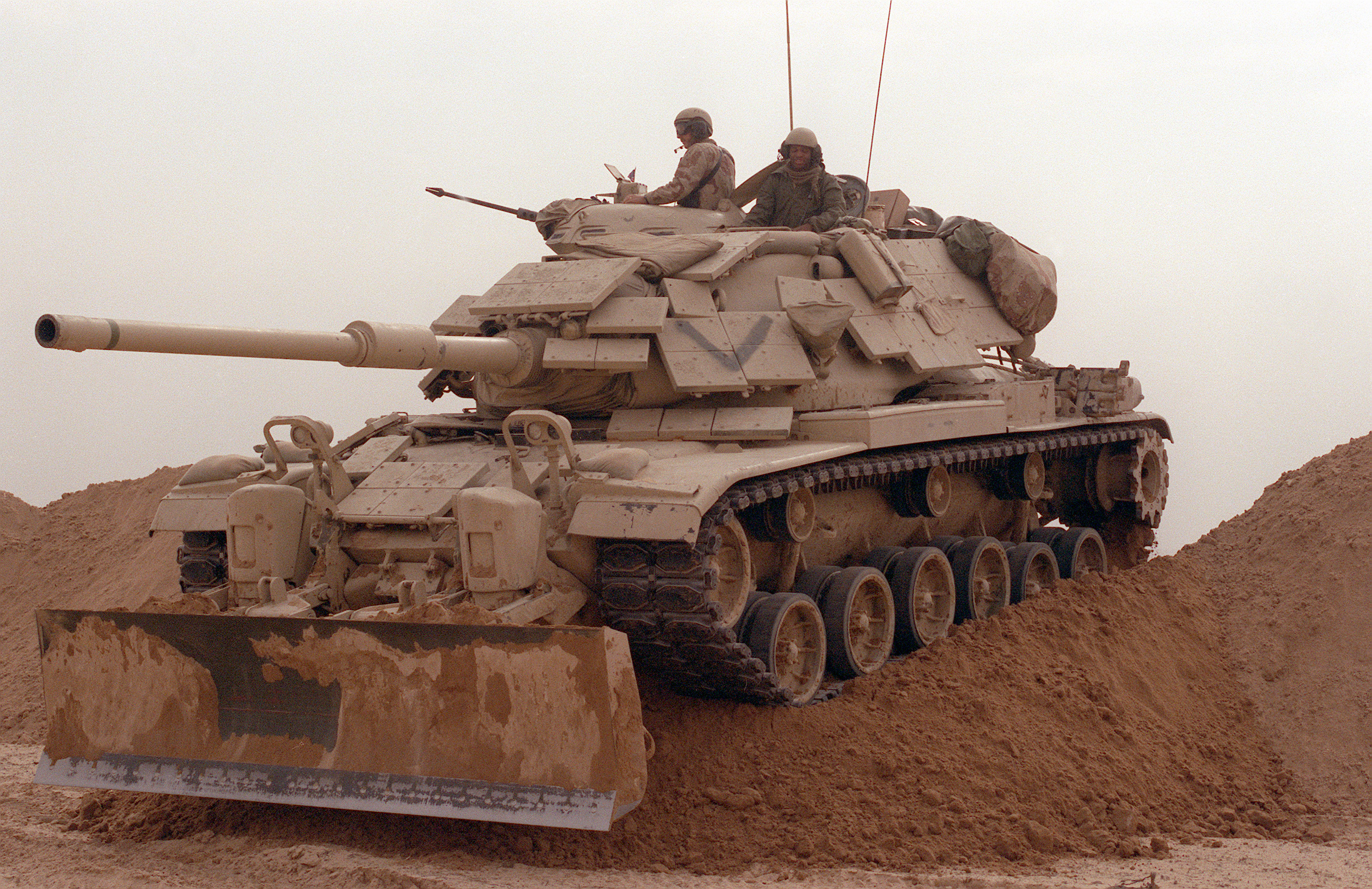
Marines from Company D, 2nd Tank Battalion, drive their M60A1 main battle tank during a breach exercise in Operation Desert Storm in 1991. The tank is fitted with reactive armor and an M-9 bulldozer kit.

The M60A1 tanks of the U.S. Marines saw action during Operation Desert Storm in 1991, opposing Iraqi armor which included the T-54/T-59, T-55, T-62, Type 69, and T-72. The M60A1s were fitted with add-on explosive reactive armor (ERA) packages and supported the drive into Kuwait City where they were involved in a two-day tank battle at the Kuwait airport with the loss of only one vehicle and no crew. They saw service with the United States Marine Corps, and the Saudi Arabian Army.

==== M1 Abrams ====
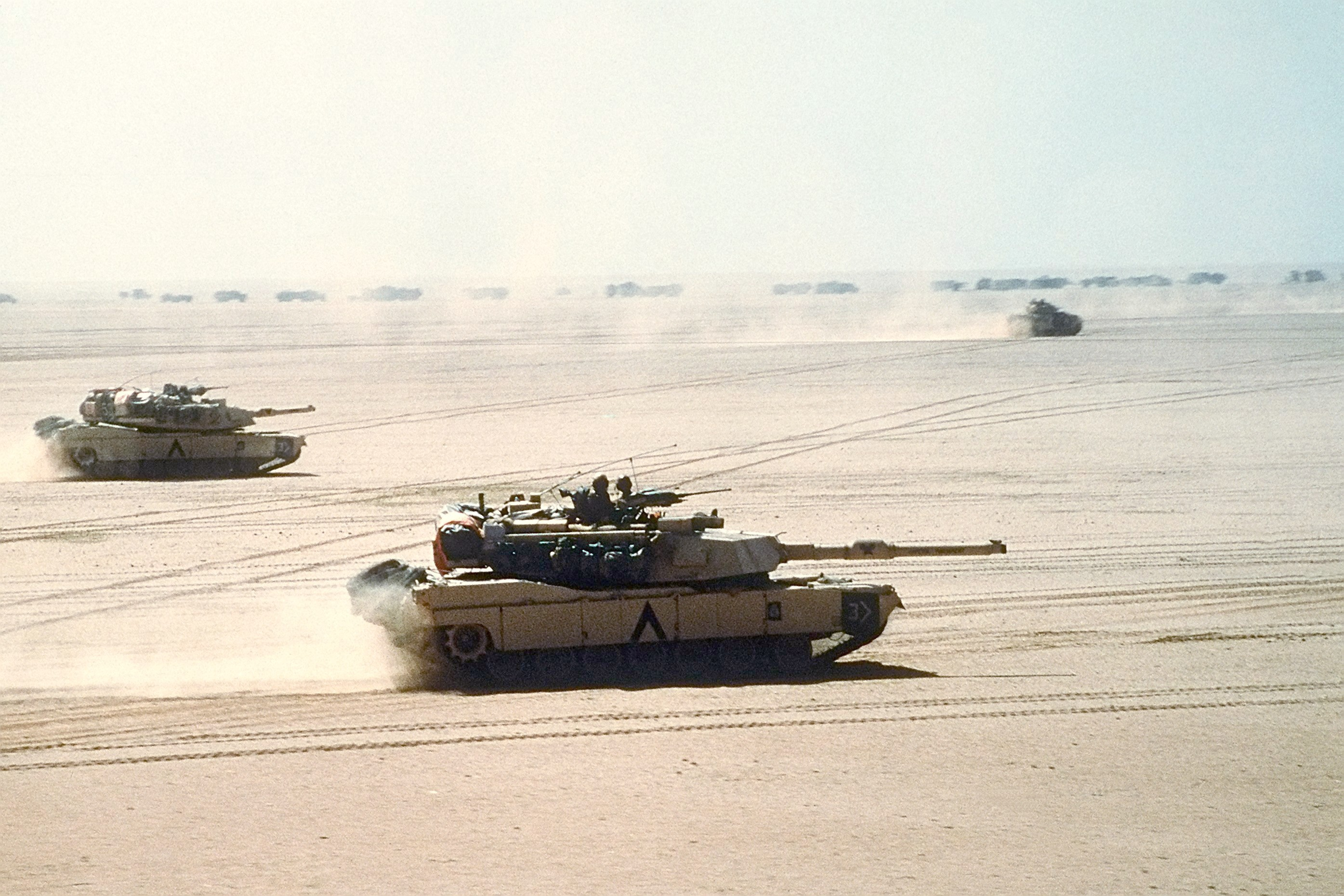
Abrams move out on a mission during the Gulf War. A Bradley IFV and logistics convoy can be seen in the background.

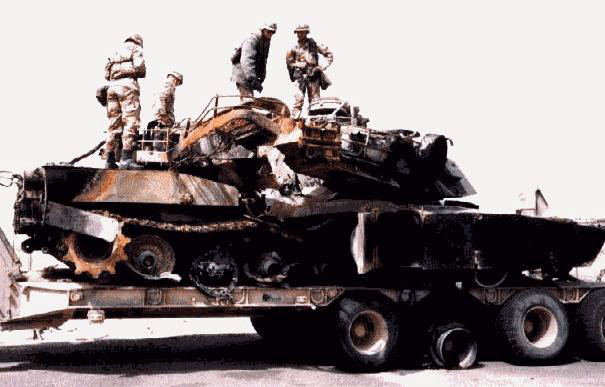
M1A1 lost to friendly fire during Gulf War.

When the Abrams entered service in the 1980s, they operated alongside M60A3 within the United States military, and with other NATO tanks in numerous Cold War exercises. These exercises usually took place in Western Europe, especially West Germany, but also in some other countries like South Korea. During such training exercises, Abrams' crews honed their skills for use against Soviet soldiers, equipment and vehicles. However, by 1991 the USSR had collapsed and the Abrams had not been in any combat.

The Abrams remained untested in combat until the Gulf War in 1991. A total of 1,848 M1A1s were deployed to Saudi Arabia. The M1A1 was superior to Iraq's Soviet-era T-55 and T-62 tanks, as well as Iraqi assembled Russian T-72s, and locally produced copies (Asad Babil tank). The T-72s, like most Soviet export designs, lacked night vision systems and then-modern rangefinders, though they did have some night fighting tanks with older active infrared systems or floodlights—just not the latest starlight scopes and passive infrared scopes as on the Abrams. Only 23 M1A1s were taken out of service in the Gulf (Note: "According to the Army's Office of Deputy Chief of Staff for Operations and Plans, 23 Abrams tanks were destroyed or damaged in the Persian Gulf area. Of the nine Abrams destroyed, seven were due to friendly fire, and two were intentionally destroyed to prevent capture after they became disabled. Other Abrams tanks were damaged by enemy fire, land mines, or on-board fires.") and one of these losses resulted in crew deaths from Iraqi fire. Some others took minor combat damage, with little effect on their operational readiness. Very few Abrams tanks were hit by enemy fire, and there was only one fatality, along with a handful of wounded as a result.

=== Interwar upgrades ===
The M1A2 was a further improvement, with a commander's independent thermal viewer and weapon station, position navigation equipment, digital data bus and a radio interface unit.

Further upgrades included depleted uranium armor for all variants, a system overhaul that returns all A1s to like-new condition (M1A1 AIM), a digital enhancement package for the A1 (M1A1D), a commonality program to standardize parts between the U.S. Army and the Marine Corps (M1A1HC) and an electronic upgrade for the A2 (M1A2 SEP).

During Operations Desert Shield and Desert Storm and for Bosnia, some M1A1s were modified with armor upgrades.

=== Afghanistan/Iraq wars ===
==== M1 Abrams ====
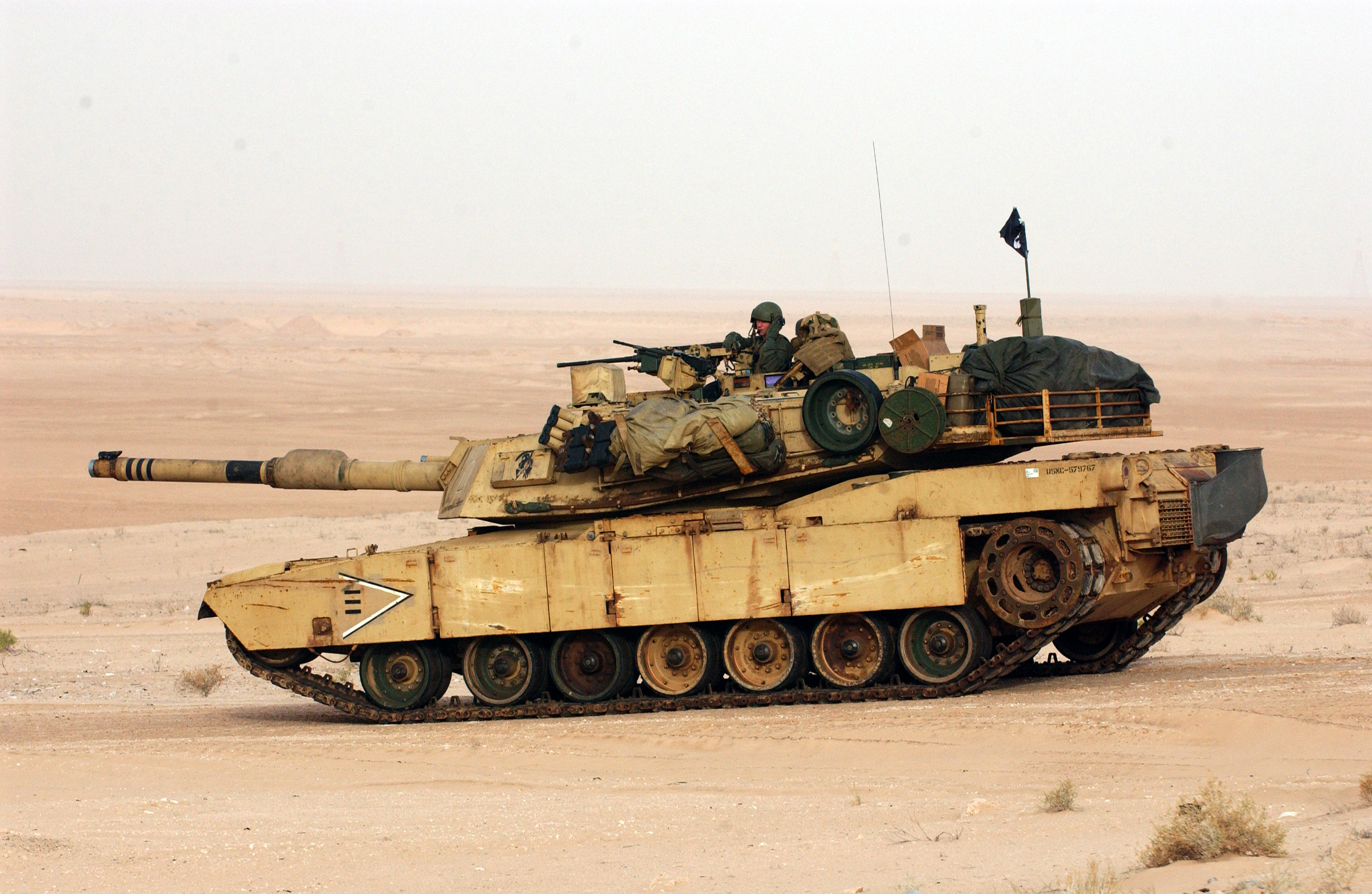
US Marine Corps M1A1 on a live fire exercise in Iraq, 2003

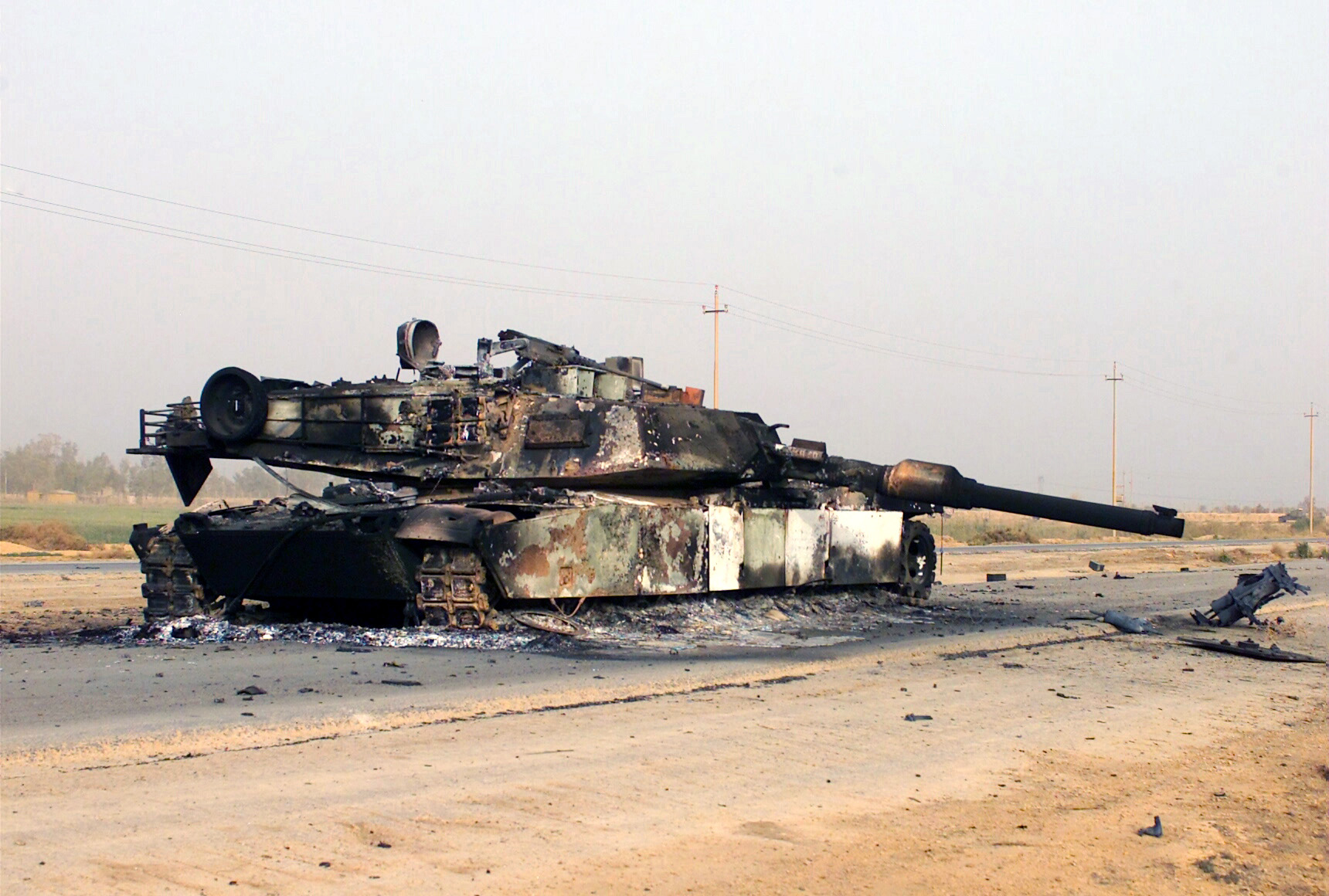
A destroyed USMC M1A1 Abrams rests in front of a Fedayeen camp just outside Jaman Al Juburi, Iraq in April 2003.

Further combat was seen during 2003 in Iraq and Afghanistan. As of March 2005, approximately 80 Abrams tanks were forced out of action by enemy attacks.

The campaign in Iraq saw very similar performance from the tank from the Persian Gulf war, with no Abrams crew member being lost to hostile fire during the invasion of Iraq, although several tank crew members were later killed by snipers and roadside bombs during the occupation that followed. Abandoned Abrams were purposely destroyed by friendly fire to prevent recovery of vehicle or technology. Damage by 25 mm AP-DU, anti-armor RPG fire and 12.7 mm rounds was encountered. But on no occasion did anti-tank guided weapons or anti-tank mines strike the US MBTs.

The most lopsided achievement of the M1A1s was the destruction of seven T-72 Lion of Babylon tanks in a point-blank skirmish (less than 50 yards (46 m)) near Mahmoudiyah, about 18 miles (29 km) south of Baghdad, with no losses for the American side. However, on 29 October 2003, two soldiers were killed and a third wounded when their tank was disabled by an anti-tank mine, which was combined with other explosives (500 kg (1,100 lb), including several 155 mm rounds) to increase its effect. The massive explosion beneath the tank knocked off the turret. This marked the first time deaths resulted from a hostile-fire assault on the M1 tank from enemy forces.

The M1A3 Abrams is in the early design period with the U.S. Army. The Army aims to build prototypes by 2014 and to begin to field the first combat-ready M1A3s by 2017. The Army anticipates that the Abrams may remain in U.S. service until 2050.

The U.S. Army's Future Combat Systems' XM1202 was to replace the Abrams and was in development when funding for the program was cut from the DoD's budget. The Army is tentatively working on a successor to the Abrams under the Decisive Lethality Platform.

== List of tanks in the United States Army ==
=== World War I ===
- M1917 - Licensed-built French Renault FT.

=== Interwar (WWI–WWII) ===
- Light Tank, M1/M1 Combat Car
- Light Tank, M2
- M2A2/A3/A4
- T7 Combat Car - Light tank

=== World War II ===
- Medium tank, M2
- M3/M5 Stuart – Light tank
- M3 Lee/medium tank, M3
- M4 Sherman + variants
- Heavy tank M6 – experimental
- Light tank (Airborne), M22 – Airborne light tank
- Light tank, M24 Chaffee
- T28 super-heavy tank – Super-heavy tank/assault gun
- Medium tanks T20/T22/T23

=== Cold War–present day ===
- M26 Pershing - Heavy/medium
- M103 heavy tank - Never saw action
- T92 light tank - Experimental
- M41 Walker Bulldog, officially 76mm Gun Tank, M41 - Light tank
- M46 Patton - Medium tank
- M47 Patton - Medium tank
- M48 Patton - Main battle tank (MBT)
- M60 - MBT
- M551 Sheridan AR/AAV - Amphibious light tank
- M8 Armored Gun System (AGS) "Buford" - Light tank
- MBT-70 - Experimental MBT
- M1 Abrams - MBT
- XM1202 MCS - Experimental

== See also ==
- History of the tank
- Tanks in World War I
- List of interwar armoured fighting vehicles
- Tanks in World War II
- Tanks of the U.S. in the World Wars
- American armored fighting vehicle production during World War II
