= List of interwar armoured fighting vehicles =

This is a list of armoured fighting vehicles developed during the interwar years between the end of the First World War (1918) and the start of the Second World War (1939). There is some overlap with tanks that served in the early part of the Second World War.

See also history of the tank, list of armoured fighting vehicles.

== Austria ==
=== Armoured cars ===
- ADAZ (never built)
- ADG (never built)
- ADGC (unknown)
- ADGK (never built)
- ADGZ (52)
- ADKZ (2)
- ADSK (6)
- Heigl Panzerauto M.25 (4)
- Heigl Panzerauto M.26 (8)

=== Light tanks ===
- Landsverk L-60 Ö (2)

=== Tankettes ===
- ADMK Mulus (334)

== Czechoslovakia ==
=== Tanks ===
==== Light tanks ====
- ČKD P-II-a (1)
- ČKD P-II-b (1)
- Kolohousenka - wheeled/tracked design (about 5)
- LT vz. 34 (also known as ČKD P-II) (50)
- LT vz. 35 (also known as Škoda Š-II-a) (298)
- LT vz. 38 did not enter service before German occupation
- Praga MT (never built, sources differ)
- Praga YNH (never built)
- Škoda Š-II (also known as S.U) (1)
- Škoda Š-II-b (1)

==== Medium tanks ====
- ST vz. 39 (also known as ČKD V-8-H) (2)
- Škoda Š-II-c (also known as Škoda T-21) (1)

==== Heavy tanks ====
- Škoda Š-III-6 (1)
- Škoda Š-III-8 (1)
- Tatra T-III (2)

==== Amphibious tanks ====
- ČKD F-IV-H (2)
- Škoda ŠOT (1)

=== Tankettes ===
- AH-IV (206)
- Škoda MU-2 (1)
- Škoda MU-4 (1)
- Škoda MU-6 (1)
- Škoda Š-I-J (1)
- Škoda Š-I-P (also known as Škoda T-2) (1)
- Škoda Š-I-SPO (1)
- Tančík vz. 33 (70)
- T-32 (Š-I-D) (8)

=== Armoured cars ===
- Praga I (unknown)
- Praga R-4 (4)
- Škoda Fiat Torino (12)
- Škoda PA-I (2)
- Škoda PA-II 'Želva', also known as OA vz.23 (12)
- Škoda PA-III (16) (OA vz. 27)
- Škoda PA-IV (<10)
- TN SPE-34 (3)
- TN SPE-37 (4)
- OA vz. 27 (15)
- OA vz. 30 (51)

== China ==
China purchased several hundred armoured combat vehicles during the 1930s. The exact model and numbers are difficult to obtain

=== Tanks ===
- Carden Loyd M1931 amphibious tank (29) - purchased in 1935.
- Carden Loyd M1936 (4) - Light two-man tank, purchased in 1936.
- Renault FT (100+) - purchased from Poland & France in 1920s & 1930s.
- Panzer I (10) - purchased from Germany in 1930s.
- T-26 (88) - Licensed copy of British Vickers 6-ton Tank, purchased from Soviets in 1938.
- Vickers 6-ton tank (20)

=== Tankettes ===
- CV-33 (20-100) - purchased in 1936, numbers disputed.
- Carden Loyd tankette Mk VI - armoured machine gun carrier, 24 purchased in 1929, 29 in 1936.

=== Armoured personnel carriers ===
- Universal Carrier (unknown, issued to Chinese units in India)

=== Armoured cars ===
- BA-6 (unknown) - purchased from Soviet Union, armed with 45 mm gun turret.

== France ==
=== Tankettes ===
- Saint-Charmond Modèle 1921 (12)

=== Tanks ===
==== Armoured reconnaissance tanks ====
- AMR 33 (123) - a cavalry tank
- AMR 35 (200) - a light tank

==== Light tanks ====
- AMC 34 (12)
- AMX 38 (2)
- Char D1 (160)
- FCM 36 (100) - infantry tank
- Hotchkiss H35 (1,200) - cavalry tank
- Hotchkiss H39 (unknown)
- Renault FT-31 (540)
- Renault FT Kégresse (42)
- Renault NC1, Renault NC2 - first 2 prototypes of Char D1
- Renault R35 (1,540) - infantry tank
- Renault R40 (145)

==== Medium tanks ====
- AMC 35 (>57)
- Char D2 (100)
- Char D3 (never built)
- Char G1 (experimental) (unfinished)
- Char G1B (never built)
- Char G1F (unknown)
- Char G1L (never built)
- Char G1P (unfinished)
- Char G1R (unfinished)
- SOMUA S35 (440) - cavalry tank

==== Heavy tanks ====
- Char B1 (34)
- Char B1 bis (369)
- Char B1 ter (2)

==== Super heavy tanks ====
- ARL Tracteur C (never built)
- Char BB (never built)
- Char Lourd - improved Char 2C (never built)
- FCM F1 (never built)

=== Self propelled guns ===
- ARL V 39 (2)
- Canon de 194 mle GPF (50)
- Renault FT BS (39)
- Somua SAu 40 (1)

=== Armoured cargo carriers ===
- Lorraine 37L (630)
- Renault UE (5,168)

=== Armoured cars ===
- AMC Schneider P 16 (100)
- AMR 39 (experimental) (4)
- Laffly AMD 50 (98)
- Laffly AMD 80 (28)
- Panhard AM 40P (experimental) (1)
- Panhard 178 (941)

== Germany ==
=== Tanks ===
==== Light tanks ====
- Leichttraktor (4)
- Panzer I (2,288)
- Panzer II (1,856)
- Sd.Kfz. 265 (190)

==== Medium tanks ====
- Grosstraktor (6)
- Neubaufahrzeug (5)

==== Heavy tanks ====
- Durchbruchwagen I (unfinished)

=== Armoured cars ===
- Daimler DZVR 21 (178)
- Kfz.13 (147)
- Kfz.14 (40)
- Leichter Panzerspähwagen (2,394)
- Magirus M-ARW (unknown)
- Schwerer Panzerspähwagen (around 1,550)

== Italy ==
=== Tanks ===
- Fiat 3000 (152) - based on the Renault FT
- Fiat M11/39 (100)

=== Tankettes ===
- Fiat L3 (2,000-2,500)

=== Armoured cars ===
- Fiat AB-611 (10)

== Japan ==
=== Tanks ===
==== Light tanks ====
- Otsu-Gata Sensha (imported Renault NC27) (10)
- Type 95 Ha-Go (2,300)
- Type 98 Ke-Ni (104)

==== Medium tanks ====
- Type 87 Chi-I (experimental) (1)
- Type 89A I-Go Kō (113)
- Type 89B I-Go Otsu (291)
- Type 97 Chi-Ha (1,162)
- Type 97 Chi-Ni (experimental) (1)

==== Heavy tanks ====
- Type 91 (experimental) (1)
- Type 95 (experimental) (4)

==== Amphibious tanks ====
- SR I-Go (experimental) (1)
- SR II Ro-Go (experimental) (1)
- SR III Ha-Go (experimental) (1)

=== Tankettes ===
- Type 92 A-I-Go (2)
- Type 92 cavalry tank (tankette) (167)
- Type 94 (823)
- Type 97 Te-Ke (616)
- Type 97 Ki-To SPAAG (experimental) (1)

=== Chemical warfare vehicles ===
- Type 94 disinfecting vehicle, Type 94 gas scattering vehicle (unknown)
- Type 97 disinfecting vehicle, Type 97 gas scattering vehicle (unknown)

=== Armoured cars ===
- Chiyoda (200)
- Sumida AMP amphibious armored car (experimental) (1)
- Sumida M.2593 (Type 91 & variant Sumida Model P) (1,000)
- Type 93 (5)
- Type 95 So-Ki armored railroad car (121–135)
- Vickers Crossley (12)

== Poland ==
=== Armoured cars ===
- Bukowski armoured car (improvised) (1)
- Chwat (improvised) (1)
- Ford FT-B (17)
- Korfanty (improvised) (1)
- Kresowiec (improvised) (1)
- Lwowskie dziecko ("Lviv's child") (improvised) (1)
- Nowina-Doliwa (1)
- Piłsudski's Tank (improvised) (1)
- Samochód pancerny wz.28 (90)
- Samochód pancerny wz. 29 (10-13)
- Samochód pancerny wz. 31 (never built)
- Samochód pancerny wz. 34 (around 90)
- Ślązak ("Silesian") (1)
- Woźniak-Walerus (also known as Powstaniec) (1)
- Zabrski powstaniec ("Zabrze upriser") (1)

=== Tankettes ===
- TK-1, TK-2 - first 2 prototypes
- TK-3/TKS (around 540 across both models)
- TKF (around 20)
- TKS-B (experimental) (1)
- TKW (experimental) (1)

=== Tanks ===
==== Light tanks ====
- Renault FT (120)
- Vickers E (38)
- 4TP (1 prototype only)
- 7TP (149)
- 9TP (2-13 2 prototypes, 11 delivered from Ursus factory to Warszawska Brygada Pancerno-Motorowa at the beginning of September 1939, could be also 7TP )
- Renault R-35 (49)
- 10TP (1 prototype only)

==== Medium tanks ====
- 14TP (1)
- 20/25TP (never built)

==== Amphibious tanks ====
- PZInż 130 amphibious tank (experimental) (1)

=== Artillery tractors ===
==== Tracked artillery tractors ====
- C2P (196-310) - an unarmoured vehicle based on tankette
- C6P, C6T - first 2 prototypes of C7P
- C7P (151)
- PZInż 152 (unknown)

==== Half-tracked artillery tractors ====
- C4P artillery tractor (80)
- PZInż 202 (1)

==== Wheeled artillery tractors ====
- C5P (also known as PZInż 342) (5)
- PZInż 302 (>2000)
- PZInż 343 (4)

=== Self-propelled guns ===
- PZInż 160 (never built)
- TKS-D (37 mm anti-tank gun) (2)
- TKD (47 mm gun) (4)

== Soviet Union ==
At the end of the Russian Civil War, Soviet Russia had a stock of imported Mark V (called Rikardo, after the Ricardo engine), Whippet (Tyeilor, after the Tylor engine), and Renault FT (Reno) tanks, and an assortment armoured trains.

By the time of the German invasion on the 22 June 1941, the Soviets already fielded 222 T-40 light amphibious tanks, 967 T-34 medium tanks and 508 KV-1 and KV-2 heavy tanks.

=== Armoured cars ===
==== Light armoured cars ====
- D-8 armoured car (28)
- D-12 (33)
- FAI
- BA-20 (2,066)
- BAD-2 (experimental)

==== Heavy armoured cars ====
- BA-27 (215)
- BA-3/BA-6 (221 BA-3) (431 BA-6)
- BA-9
- BA-10 (3311)
- BA-11 (17)

=== Tankettes ===
- T-17 "Liliput" (experimental)
- T-23 (experimental)
- T-27

=== Tanks ===
==== Amphibious tanks ====
- T-37A
- T-38

==== Light tanks ====
- Russkiy Reno (or M, copy of Renault FT)
- T-16
- T-18 (or MS-1)
- T-19
- T-26 (license-built copy of Vickers 6-ton)
- BT-2
- BT-5
- BT-7
- BT-8

==== Flame & engineer tanks ====
- ST-26 engineer tank
- OT-26 flame tank
- OT-130 flame tank
- KhT-26
- KhT-130
- KhT-133

==== Medium tanks ====
- T-24 (24)
- T-28
- T-29 (experimental)
- A-20 (experimental)

==== Heavy tanks ====
- T-35 (61)

=== Self-propelled guns ===
- SU-12 76.2mm gun truck
- T-26 A artillery support tank
- BT-7A artillery support tank
- 4M quad 7.62mm Maxim anti-aircraft truck
- 29K (artillery) 76.2mm anti-aircraft truck
- ZiS-42 25mm anti-aircraft truck

== Sweden ==
=== Tanks ===
==== Light tanks ====
- Strv m/21-29 (10)
- Strv m/38-39-40 (180)

==== Medium tanks ====
- Strv m/31 (3)
- Strv fm/31 (1)

=== Tankettes ===
- Strv m/37 (48)

=== Armoured cars ===
- Pbil m/31
- Pbil m/39-40 (48)
- Pbil m/41 (5)

== United Kingdom ==
=== Armoured cars ===
- Vickers Crossley armoured car
- Crossley D2E1 & D2E2
- Morris CS9
- Lanchester 6x4 Armoured Car
- Crossley Vickers 20\60 Light 6 Wheeler
- Armstrong Siddeley B10E1 & B10E2

=== Tankettes ===
- Carden Loyd tankette - Mark IV, V, VI
- Crossley-Martel
- Morris-Martel tankette

=== Tanks ===
- Vickers Tank - Number 01 & Number 02 (1921–22)
- Vickers 6-Ton (153)
- Vickers Commercial Light Tank - Model 1933, Model 1934, Model 1936, Model 1937 - sales for export. Design based on Carden-Loyd Light Tank.
- Medium Tank A/T 1 - amphibious tank, experimental
- Vickers Medium Mark C & D - intended for export, prototypes sold to Japan and Ireland.
- Cruiser Mk I - General Staff Specification A9
- Cruiser Mk II
- Cruiser Mk III
- Matilda I
- Matilda II
- Light tank Mk I-Mk V
- Light Tank Mark VI (1,682)
- Light Tank Mk VII Tetrarch (100+)
- Medium Mark I (80)
- Medium Mark II (170)
- A6 "Sixteen tonner" (3 - A6E1, A6E2, A6E3)
- Medium Mark III (3)
- A7 medium tank (3 - A7E1, A7E2, A7E3)
- Vickers A1E1 Independent (1 prototype)
- A3E1 three man tank, "Carrier, Machine gun"
- A4E1 Carden-Loyd Mk VII
- A5E1 Vickers 'Carden-Loyd' 3-man light tank
- Vickers Patrol tank Mk. 1 & Mk. 2
- Vickers D3E1 Wheel Cum Track tank
- Vickers L3E1 & L3E2 3-man light tanks
- Vickers-Carden-Loyd light amphibious tank (A4E11, A4E12, L1E1, L1E2)

=== Self-propelled guns ===
- Birch gun

== United States ==
=== Light tanks ===
- Disston Tractor Tank (6)
- T2 combat car
- T2E1 combat car
- T5 combat car
- T5E1 combat car
- M1 combat car (~113)
- T7 combat car
- T1 Cunningham (6)
- T2 light tank
- T3 light tank
- M2 light tank (~696)
- Christie Model 1919

=== Medium tanks ===
- T4 combat car
- T4E1 combat car
- T4E2 combat car
- Christie T3 Medium/M.1931/M.1940/T1 combat car
- T2 medium tank
- M2 medium tank
- M1921 medium tank
- M1922 medium tank

=== Armoured cars ===
- M3 scout car (unknown)

=== Self Propelled guns ===
- T3 HMC
