= T2 tank =

T2 medium tank
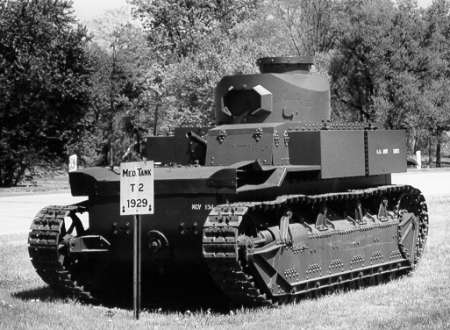
- Type: Medium tank
- Place of origin: United States

Service history
- In service: prototype only
- Used by: United States Army

Production history
- Designer: Rock Island Arsenal
- Produced: 1930
- No. built: 1

Specifications
- Mass: 13.6 tons
- Length: 16 ft (4.9 m)
- Width: 8 ft 0 in (2.44 m)
- Height: 9 ft 1 in (2.77 m)
- Crew: 4 (Commander, gunner, loader, driver)
- Armor: 0.25 to 1 in (6.4 to 25.4 mm)
- Main armament: 47 mm T1 (75 rounds) turret 37 mm M5, L/50 gun, hull
- Secondary armament: 12.7 mm M2 Browning machine gun (2000 rounds); 7.62 mm M1919 Browning machine gun (4500 rounds)
- Engine: Liberty L-12 V12 gasoline engine water-cooled 338 hp (252 kW)
- Suspension: Vickers type leaf springs with roller pairs
- Operational range: 121 miles
- Maximum speed: paved 25 mph (40 km/h) terrain 15 mph (24 km/h)

The T2 medium tank was an American design that replaced three prototype medium tank designs started in the 1920s for conducted by the United States Army. The T2 tank built in 1930 by Rock Island Arsenal. Its legacy, however, was the M2 light tank, developed into the M2 medium tank, and onto the M3 Lee and M4 Sherman medium tanks.

== Design ==
Following the testing of the medium tank M1921 two new medium tank projects were approved in 1926, one of which was for a lighter 15 ton tank design. The first design, armed with a gun in the hull front and a smaller gun in the turret, did not progress due to lack of funding and instead the Light Tank T1E1 was used as a basis.

The T2 Medium tank used the same Liberty L-12 engine found on the Mark VIII tank, resulting in a power-to-weight ratio of 24 horsepower per ton. This engine was placed in the front.

The design of the T2 was largely inspired by the British Vickers Medium Mark II and was later developed into the M2 light tank. When the T2 medium tank was built, its weight had to be reduced drastically because the US War Department had set a maximum weight of 15 tons. The T2 weighed only 14 tons when it was combat-loaded. The secondary armament was a 0.5 inch (12.7mm) machine gun and a 0.3 inch (7.62mm) machine gun at the front of the hull on the right; these were later replaced with a single .30 cal machine gun. The primary armament was a 47mm T1 semi-automatic gun mounted on the turret and it initially had an additional 37mm cannon placed on the hull but that was abandoned in 1931. Only one T2 was produced; it was on display at Fort Gregg-Adams, Virginia.

As of April 2025, this vehicle now resides at the national armor and cavalry collection, fort Moore (Benning) Georgia. It still has not been given a slot in the main collection building, but sits on a travel trailer between the TSF and the Workshop building.
