= M1921 medium tank =

Medium tank M1921
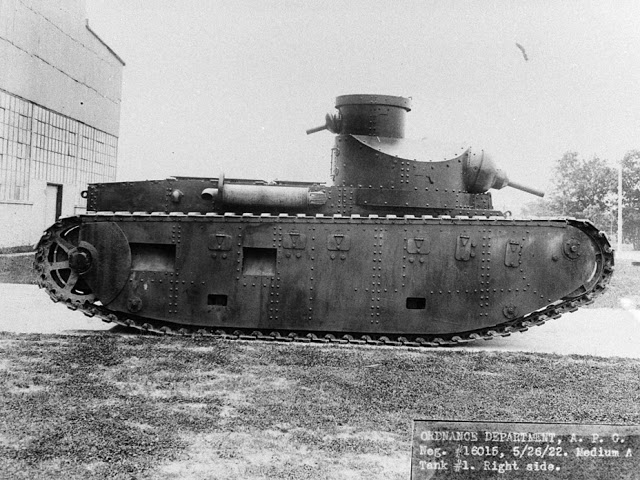
- Medium tank M1921 at the Aberdeen Proving Grounds
- Type: Medium tank
- Place of origin: United States

Service history
- In service: 1921–1926
- Used by: US

Production history
- Designer: United States Army Ordnance Department
- Designed: 1921
- Manufacturer: Rock Island Arsenal
- No. built: 1

Specifications
- Mass: 23 short tons (21 t)
- Armor: 1 in (25 mm)
- Main armament: 57mm gun
- Secondary armament: two machine guns
- Engine: Liberty L-12 engine Gasoline. 338 hp (252 kW)
- Power/weight: 12 kW/t (16 hp/t)
- Maximum speed: T1: 15 km/h (9.3 mph)

The medium tank M1921 was a medium tank built in the United States in the inter-war period. In design, it was similar to earlier World War I era tanks. United States Army engineers worked on the design of the tank, with some influence from British designs of the period, and from the earlier war experience. One example was produced. The tank was an early example of a turreted US tank, less usual at the time, with the turret housing the main gun, with the tank also possessing two machine guns for defense.

== Development ==
The United States Army developed the tank with the idea that the US could produce a locally produced tank, and not rely on British or French technology, who were some of the main producers and exporters of tanks at the time. The tank was produced at the Rock Island Arsenal. The biggest problem was the engine, which was meant to provide 220 hp (160 kW) at 1,200 rpm, but in fact generated less than that. The engine was later replaced with a 338 hp (252 kW) Liberty L-12 engine, and then a later a Packard 8-cylinder. The tank had a semi-spherical mounting for its main gun. One MG was mounted coaxially with the gun, and the second was mounted on a second turret on the top of the main turret. The shape of the vehicle was basically a box, with a turret on top, with minimal sloping of armor at the front. The tank was very similar to the British Medium Mark D tank. The design had a very similar appearance to the M1919, its biggest difference was the removal of the turret for a fixed gun mount, the 57 mm gun mounted in the semi spherical ball-mount in the front hull. Despite the modifications, the US Army still found the design underpowered after the tests concluded in 1923. It was also considered to have poor maneuverability and was found to be mechanically unreliable. Additionally, it was found to have too confined crew space and was made with bad workmanship. The design was totally rejected in 1924. The cost of the tank for the tests were $82,000, not counting the actual cost of the testing process.

== Specifications ==
The tank featured armor of up to 2 inches (51 mm) of steel. Its top speed was 30 kilometers per hour. The turret housed a main 57 mm gun, as well as two machine guns for secondary defense. It weighed 23 tons.

== History ==
One tank was made, and the tank was tested, but found wanting in regards to the power train. The second tank from the order with the cable suspension, the medium tank M1922, was produced a year later. The tank was tested until 1926, after which its whereabouts were not known.

== Phase 1 medium tank ==
The M1921 underwent further development in order to solve the problem of insufficient power from the Murray and Tregurtha marine engine. Packard were contracted to produce a "purpose-built tank engine" for it. This was fitted and the M1921 was known as the "Phase 1 medium tank". This was sufficient for two new tank designs to be approved in 1926. One was a 15-ton tank (medium tank T2) and the other a development of the M1921 which became the medium tank T1.
