= Front Drive Motor Company =

- Industry: Commercial vehicle
- Founded: 1912; 114 years ago
- Founder: J. Walter Christie
- Defunct: 1918; 108 years ago
- Headquarters: Hoboken, New Jersey, US

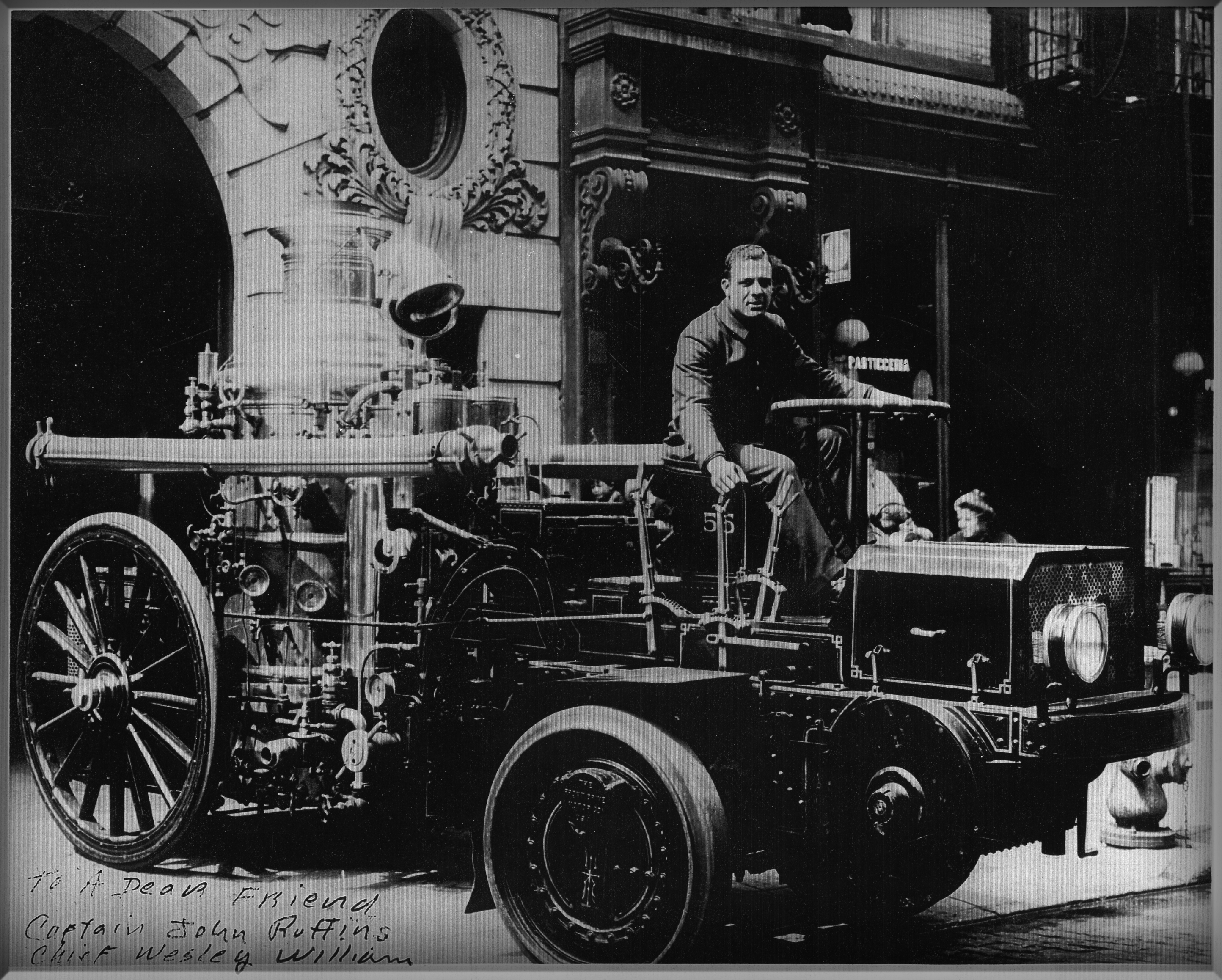

The Front Drive Motor Company was an American manufacturer of commercial vehicles founded in 1912 by J. Walter Christie.⟨1904 ? (Reference 4⟩

There was no connection to the Front Drive Motor Company of the same name from Missouri.

== History ==
The company was based in New Jersey, with one source showing that it was started in 1912, but another stating that production of commercial vehicles started in December of 1911. Production ended in 1918. A total of around 600 vehicles were built.

The first fire trucks produced consisted of motorized axles mounted on the fire brigade's existing motorless steam pumps. These fore-carriages used a T-head 4 cylinder engine. The first model had a 90 hp four-cylinder engine mounted longitudinally above the axle. The first buyer was the New York City Fire Department.

The following fire engines had a transverse engine which was installed under the front hood or under the driver's seat. The front-wheel drive system was patented by A. Ortengren on 7 November, 1916.

The company ceased production of fire trucks in 1918, but in 1919 they designed the Christie Model 1919 tank, which was not accepted for production.
