= 20/25TP =

Polish medium tank design

- Type: Medium tank/Heavy tank
- Place of origin: Poland

Specifications (design values)
- Mass: 22 tonnes KSUS version 23 tonnes BBTBr.Panc. 25 tonnes PZInż version
- Length: 7.3 m (23 ft 11 in)
- Width: 2.6 m (8 ft 6 in)
- Height: 2.8 m (9 ft 2 in)
- Crew: 5 or 6
- Armor: 35–80 mm (1.4–3.1 in)
- Main armament: 1 × 70 mm KSUS version 1 × Bofors 75 mm BBTBr.Panc. version 1 × 75 mm wz. 1922/1924 PZInż version
- Secondary armament: 3 × 7.92 mm Ckm wz.30 KSUS and BBTBr.Panc. version 1 × 7.92 mm Ckm wz.30 PZInż version
- Engine: gasoline engine 2 × 300 hp (220 kW) KSUS version 1 x 500 hp BBTBr.Panc. version 1 x 400 hp PZInż. version
- Power/weight: 27 hp/tonne KSUS version 22 hp/tonne BBTBr.Panc. version 16 hp/tonne PZInż. version
- Suspension: Quarter-elliptical leaf spring suspension
- Maximum speed: 45 km/h (28 mph) KSUS version 40 km/h PZInż. version

The 20/25TP (dwudziestotonowy polski/dwudziestopięciotonowy polski; "20-tonne Polish/25-tonne Polish") was a Polish medium tank concept that was never built. There were three projects designed by KSUS and BBTBr.Panc. and PZInż which even managed to build a wooden model of it. The name 20/25TP is not official; it was created by the author Janusz Magnuski analogously to nomenclature used for other Polish tanks of that period. According to different classification it could be medium tank or heavy tank.

== Design ==
KSUS project was in two variants, assuming the usage of 75 mm anti-aircraft gun and 35 mm armor. As well as the main turret, there were two turrets at the front of the vehicle equipped with heavy machine guns. There was another heavy machine gun in the main turret. Weight of the tank was 22 tonnes. The drive consisted of two petrol engines of 300 hp each. The ability to cross the ditches reached 2.5 meters, wading depth reached up to 1.2 m. The tank would have a length of 7.3 m, width 2.6 m, height 2.8 m Assumed speed of travel on the road was 45 km/h (28 mph). The crew was six people.

The tank designed by BBTBr.Panc. was armed with a 75 mm Bofors gun coupled to a 40 mm Bofors L/60 cannon. The remainder of the armament was three heavy machine guns. It would have 50 mm armor with a total weight of 23 tons. The project had a 500 hp engine for a planned top speed of 40 km/h (25 mph) with the crew of five people. As the only one turret.

PZInż project was equipped with a 75 mm anti-aircraft gun wz.22/24, one heavy machine gun and 60 mm armor. It was also the heaviest - the weight would be 25 tons.

== See also ==
- Neubaufahrzeug, a similar German tank
- T-28, a similar Soviet tank
- Polish armaments 1939-1945

== Bibliography ==
- (in Polish) Mała Encyklopedia Wojskowa, Wydawnictwo Ministerstwa Obrony Narodowej, wyd. I, W-wa 1967, T. I, str. 152
- (in Polish) Nowa Technika Wojskowa 9/2006
