= Medium Mark D =

Medium Tank Mark D
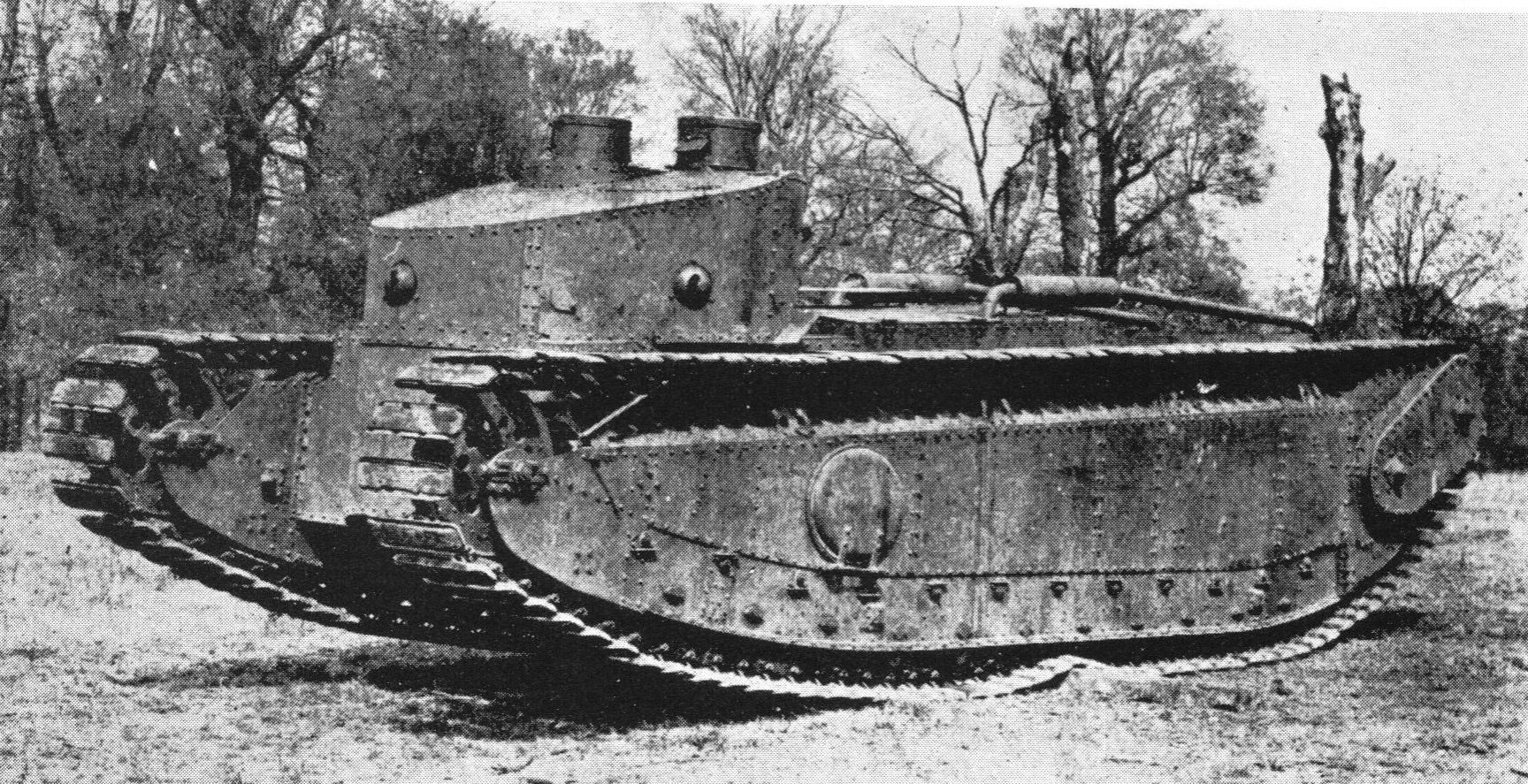
- Medium Mark D Modified

Production history
- Designer: Philip Johnson, Tank Design Department
- Manufacturer: Fowler, Vickers, Royal Ordnance
- Produced: 1919
- No. built: 4

Specifications (D Modified)
- Length: 9.7m
- Width: 2.7m
- Main armament: 3 x Hotchkiss machine guns
- Engine: Siddeley V-6 petrol engine 240 hp (180 kW)
- Suspension: Cable spring
- Maximum speed: 20 mph

Medium Mark D was a British medium tank developed at the end of the First World War.

It was envisaged as a vehicle to be used in "Plan 1919" an offensive on the Western Front which would use large numbers of heavy and medium tanks to break through the German defences, destroy lines of communication crippling the German army and thus end the war. The Armistice ended the war in 1918 and it would never be tested in combat but development continued for the post-war needs of the British Army. The unusual suspension proved problematic and the earlier tanks were replaced by a Vickers design - the Medium Mark I - in the 1920s.

It should not be confused with export Vickers Medium Mark D tank, built in one unit for Ireland in 1929.

== Development ==
J F C Fuller's plan 1919 (circulated in mid-1918) was for the heavy tanks to engage and pin the German troops allowing faster tanks to penetrate the flanks and encircle the enemy isolating them from the chain of command precipitating a breakdown of morale and fighting capacity. Fuller calculated this fast tank, which he called Medium Mark D in the text, would have to manage 20 mph (32 km/h) - substantially faster than any tank then in service - and that it would be no more than 20 tons in weight.

Major Johnson, working at the Mechanical Warfare Department's grounds at Dollis Hill, identified that a more powerful engine and a sprung suspension would be needed. He had experimentally fitted leaf springs to both a Mark IV heavy tank and a Medium Mark A "Whippet" and also fitted powerful Rolls-Royce Eagle aeroplane engines to a Whippet.

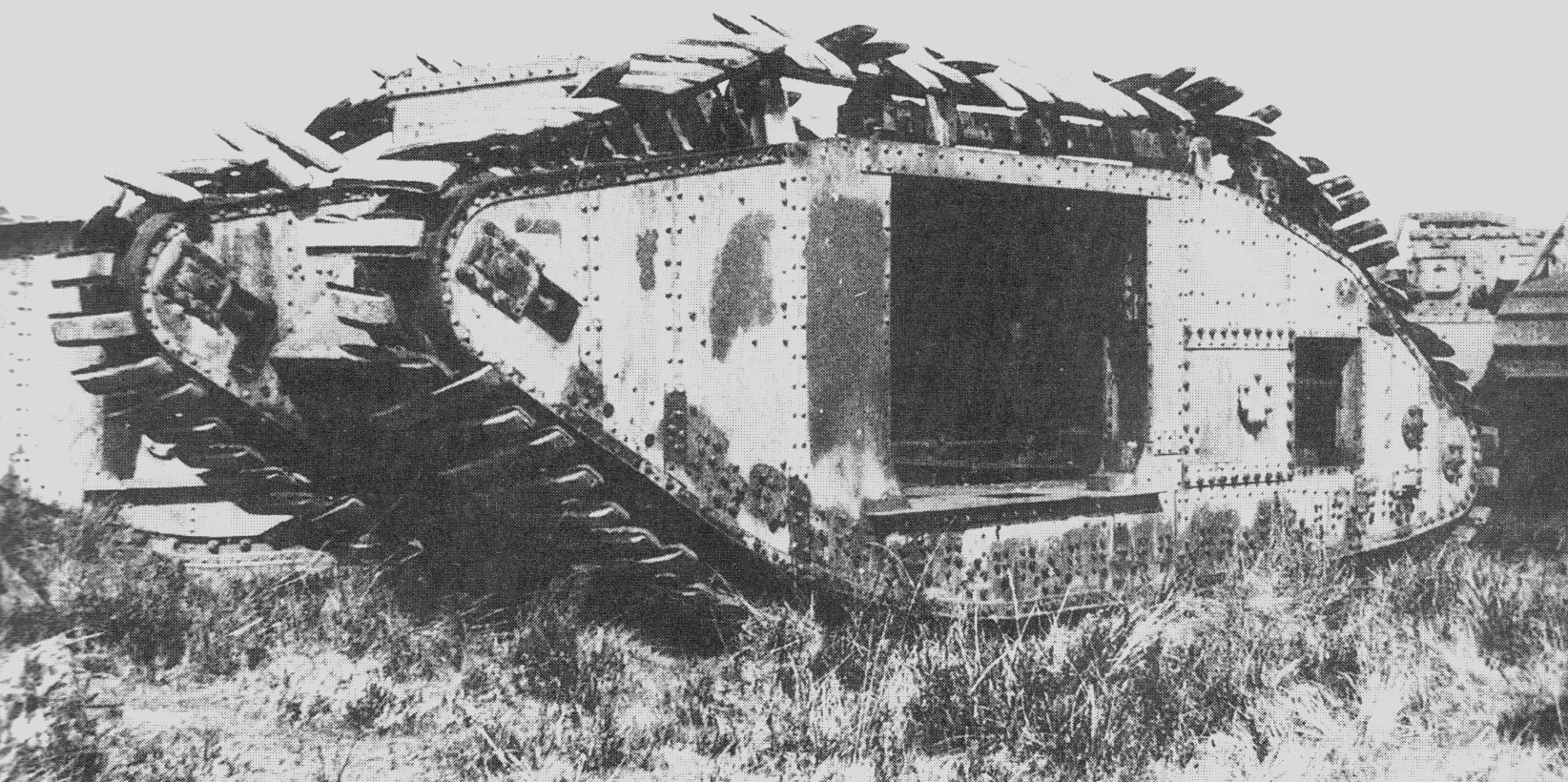
Johnson's ideas were tested by conversion of a Mark V tank

To give a suspension that could flex without adding the weight of individual springs for each roller, Johnson, based on his pre-war experience with Fowler ploughing engines, used steel cable ropes wound between the rollers and terminated in springs. Wire ropes were also used to connect the track links together, allowing them to flex during turning manoeuvres and for the individual links to pivot on rough ground. This was tested on a converted Mark V, which reached 20 mph (32 km/h)

With the end of the war the immediate need for the Mark D disappeared. Fuller was now at the War Office and continued to champion the tank adding on a requirement for amphibious use.

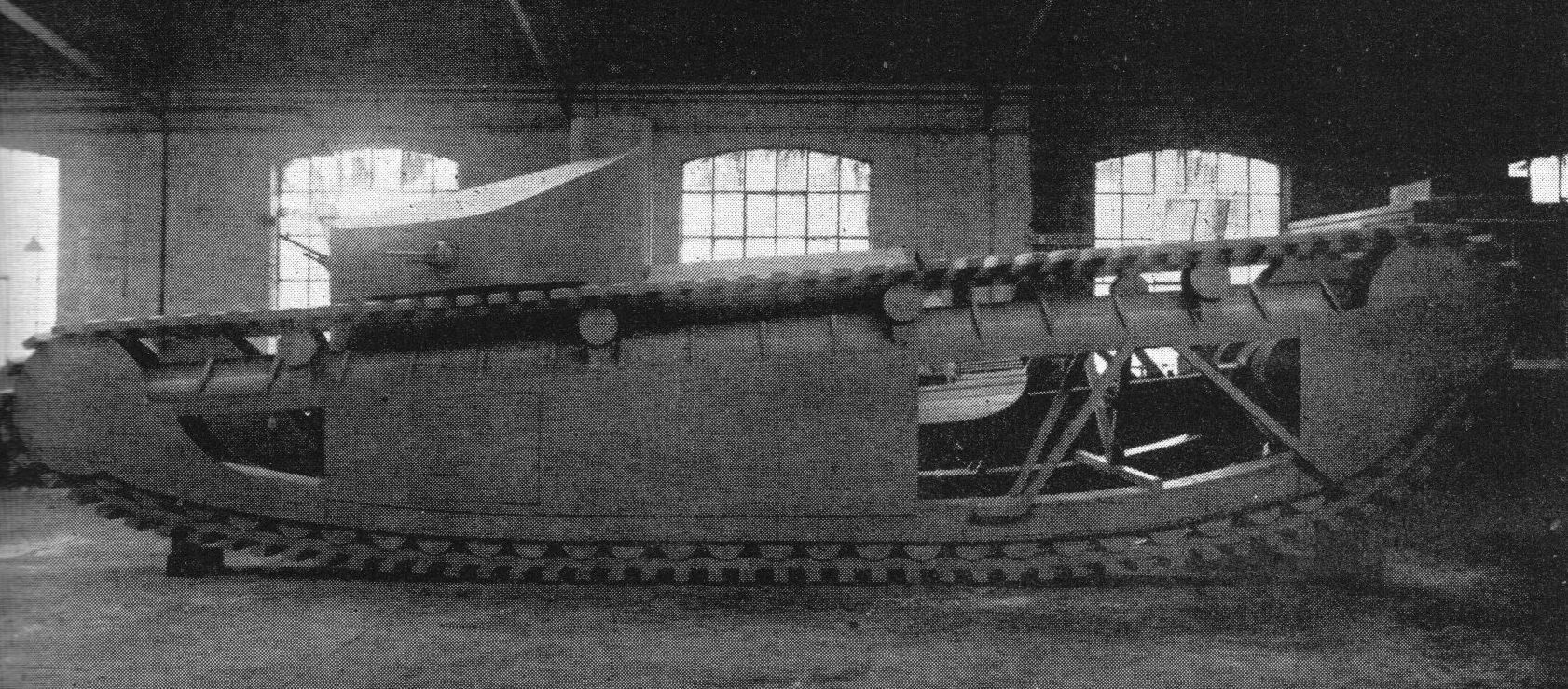
The wooden mockup shows the forward tilt of the track run

Before the war a wooden mockup of the Mark D had been built and shown to members of the Tank Corps and an orders for ten prototypes placed (four from Fowler and six from Vickers).

The tank as built was relatively long and narrow with a cylindrical fighting compartment at the front with machine gun ports to the front and sides. As it was so narrow the driving position was displaced to the back of the fighting compartment with the driver under a small cupola. To improve the view forward the roof of the fighting compartment sloped down from the cupola. Because the track runs sloped forward, another feature to improve driver views, in order to cross taller obstacles the driver was expected to take them by reversing. Powered by a Siddeley Puma engine the speed was in excess of Fuller's specification.

Swimming trials were carried out with two modified tanks; the Mark D* which was widened from 7 ft 5 in (2.26 m) to 8 ft 5 in (2.57 m) and the Mark D** at 9 ft (2.7 m); the latter swimming well in a river test.

Sufficient funds were provided for production of 45 tanks complete with Rolls-Royce engines, later cut to 20 of which only three were built - by the Royal Ordnance Factory - based on the D** and known as the "D Modified" (DM).

Johnson's design department, and any further work on the D was terminated in 1923.

== Variants and derivatives ==
- Mark D : production; width 7 ft 5 in (2.26 m), Siddeley Puma V-6 petrol engine, 240 hp (180 kW)
- Mark D* : 1 prototype; widened to 8 ft 5 in (2.57 m), Siddeley Puma V-6 petrol engine, 240 hp (180 kW)
- Mark D** : 1 prototype; widened to 9 ft (2.7 m), modified Siddeley Puma V-6 petrol engine, 300 hp (220 kW) (it was also suited for the Rolls-Royce Eagle VIIIbut never built as such)
- Mark DM : 3 prototypes; Rolls-Royce Eagle VIII V-12 petrol engine, 360 hp (270 kW)
- Light Infantry Tank - one example
- Tropical Tank - three lighter vehicles based on the D following Johnson's visit with two Mark Ds to India

== See also ==
- Medium Tank M1922 - American tank developed to test the cable track system
