= M1922 medium tank =

Medium Tank M1922
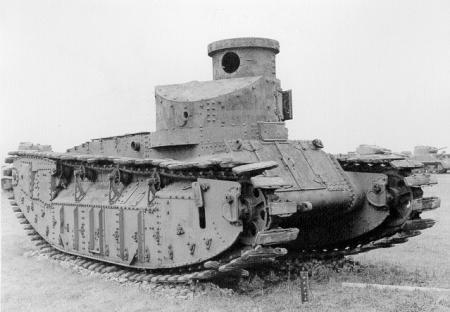
- The M1922 used cables to join the individual track links
- Type: medium tank
- Place of origin: United States

Service history
- In service: 1922–1928
- Used by: US

Production history
- Designer: United States Army Ordnance Department
- Designed: 1922
- Manufacturer: Rock Island Arsenal
- No. built: 1

Specifications
- Mass: 25.5 short tons (23.1 t)
- Length: 25 ft 9 in (7.85 m)
- Width: 8 ft 8 in (2.64 m)
- Height: 8 ft (3.04 m)
- Crew: 4
- Armor: 1 in (25 mm) to 0.375 in (9.5 mm)
- Main armament: 57mm QF Hotchkiss
- Secondary armament: two machine guns
- Engine: Murray and Tregurtha, Marine, 6-cylinders forced water-colled Gasoline. 195 hp (145 kW) at 1,250 rpm
- Power/weight: 6.29 kW/t (8.44 hp/t)
- Suspension: cable suspension
- Operational range: 160 mi (260 km)
- Maximum speed: 15.7 mph (25.3 km/h)

The Medium Tank M1922 was an inter-war period medium tank built in the United States. It was largely a variant of the Medium Tank M1921, with some changes to use the same track suspension system that had been developed for the Medium Mark D.

The M1922 was initially the second tank in an order for two M1921s placed in April 1920 but the order was changed to one M1921 to the original design and one using the cable track system

== Specifications ==
Like the M1921, the M1922 was essentially a box-shaped tank with a mildly sloped front. It had a round turret, with a 57mm QF Hotchkiss gun carrying 146 rounds. The tank's suspension was of the flexible type, with each track shoe 17 inches (43 cm) wide. The top speed was 15.7 mph (25.3 km/h). the engine is a Murray and Tregurtha, Marine, 6-cylinder providing 195 hp at 1,250 rpm. it weighed 25.5 Short tons. The armour was the same as the M1921. ranging from 1 inch (25 mm) to 0.375 inches (0.95 cm). The cable suspension system, similar to that of the earlier British Medium Mark D, was superior to other tanks of the era, and it was faster than the M1921.

== Use/deployment ==
11 were produced, and it was only used for testing. A 16-ton limit was imposed on tanks because of the load on bridges and roads in the United States, which led to the tank being declined for uptake by the military. One example was preserved in the Ordnance Museum, sometime after 1926. The T1 US tank was based on both the Medium Tank M1921 and the M1922.

== Survivors ==
There is at least one surviving example in the U.S. Army Armor & Cavalry Collection, Fort Benning, Georgia
