= Christie Model 1919 =

Prototype tank

The Christie Model 1919 was a prototype tank built by J. Walter Christie's Front Drive Motor Company in 1919.

== History and Development ==
Christie used the experience gained before and during World War I to develop his "Convertible Suspension", which allowed a vehicle to run on either tracks or wheels. Most tanks of the time period weren't durable enough to be driven to the front on their own, so instead were delivered by trucks and then driven to where they were needed. The Convertible Suspension was designed to overcome this deficiency by allowing for high speed on roads using tires and then having the tracks installed on the tank before entering the battlefield. After developing several vehicles which culminated in the M.1919. The United States Army ordered a single example for evaluation on 22 November 1919, which was approved on 8 June 1920.

The tank featured four large road wheels with rubber tires on the corners of the hull, a central bogie on each side with a pair of road wheels with coil springs which could be lowered or raised depending on if tires or tracks were used, and it was driven by an axle at the rear. The hull was divided into sections for the driver, gunner, and engine. On top of the hull was a flat-topped, round turret armed with the U.S. version of the Ordnance QF 6-pounder. On top of the main turret a smaller, semi-spherical turret housed a .30 caliber machine gun. Both turrets could move independently of the other.

In February 1921 the tank was delivered to the Aberdeen Proving Ground and underwent tests until 21 April 1921. The Army wasn't impressed by the new tank, citing the lack of suspension (and thus bumpy ride), as well as the lack of speed needed for new military doctrines being developed.

Christie revised the design and debuted the M.1921 a year later. The M.1921 had added suspension and the turret was removed and the guns placed within the hull instead, but it was also rejected on the grounds of being unreliable and under-powered. Tests of the M.1921 continued until July 1924

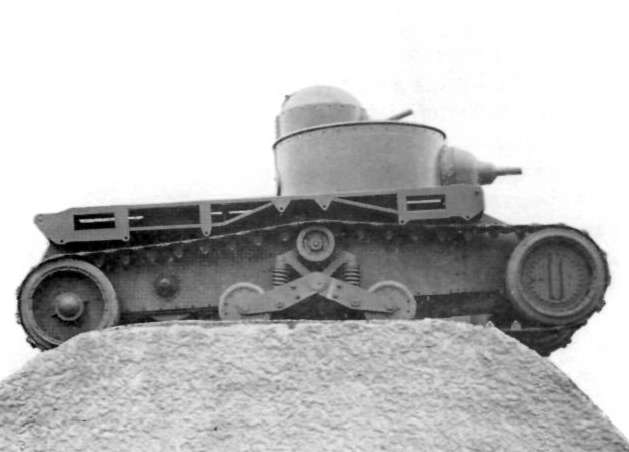
Going up and down 45º and 35º slopes.

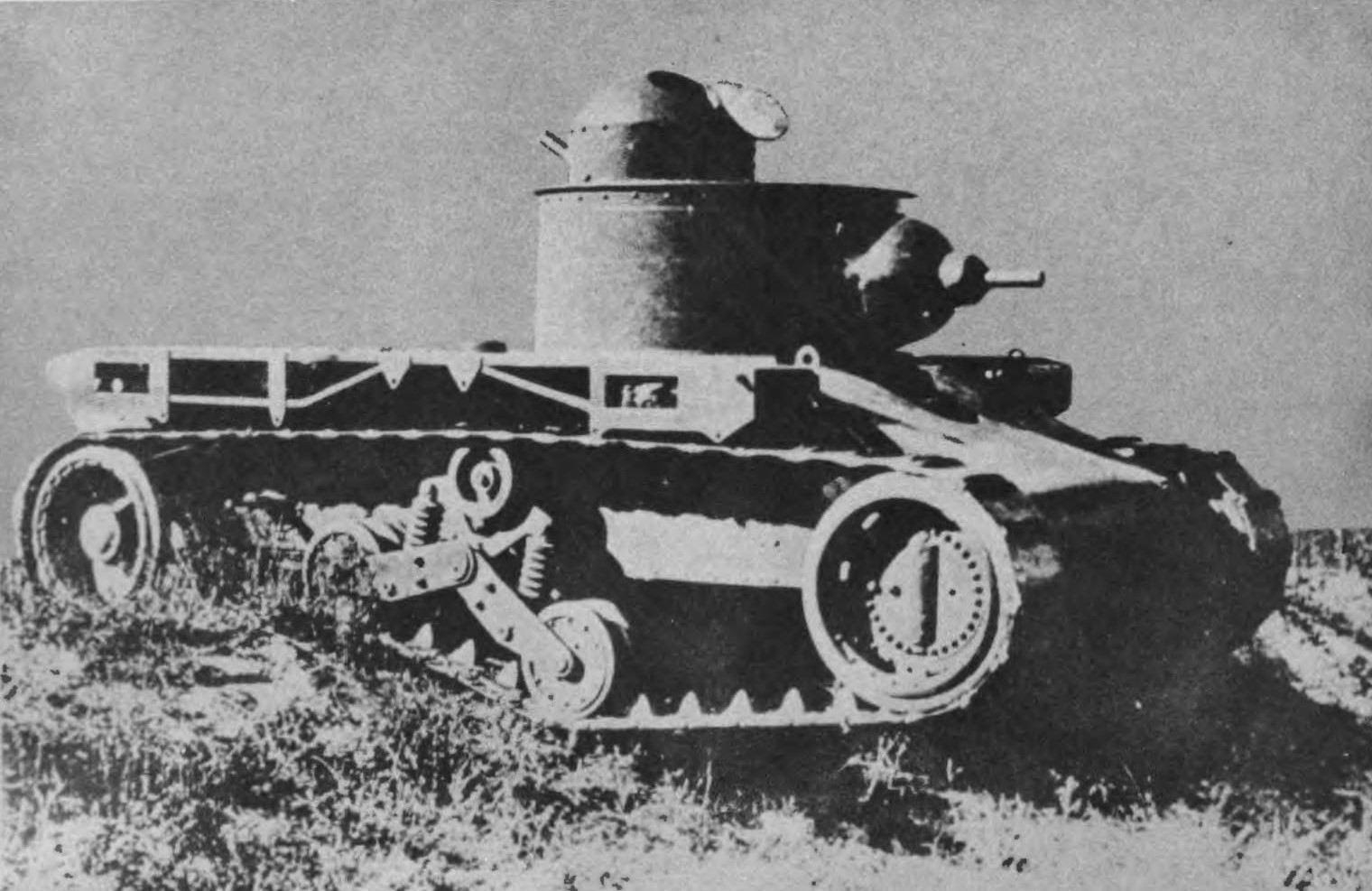
AD1116719-020 M1919 Christie tank

== Specifications ==
- Length: 18 ft 2 in
- Width: 8 ft 6 in
- Height: 8 ft 9 in
- Weight: 29,762 lb
- Crew: 3
- Engine: Christie 6-cylinder 120 hp water-cooled engine
- Max Speed: 7 mph (tracks), 13 mph (tires)
- Range: 40.4 mi
- Armament: One 57 mm Gun M1, one .30 caliber machine gun
- Armour: 0.25-1 in
- Track width: 15 in
