= M2 medium tank =

American medium battle tank

Medium tank M2
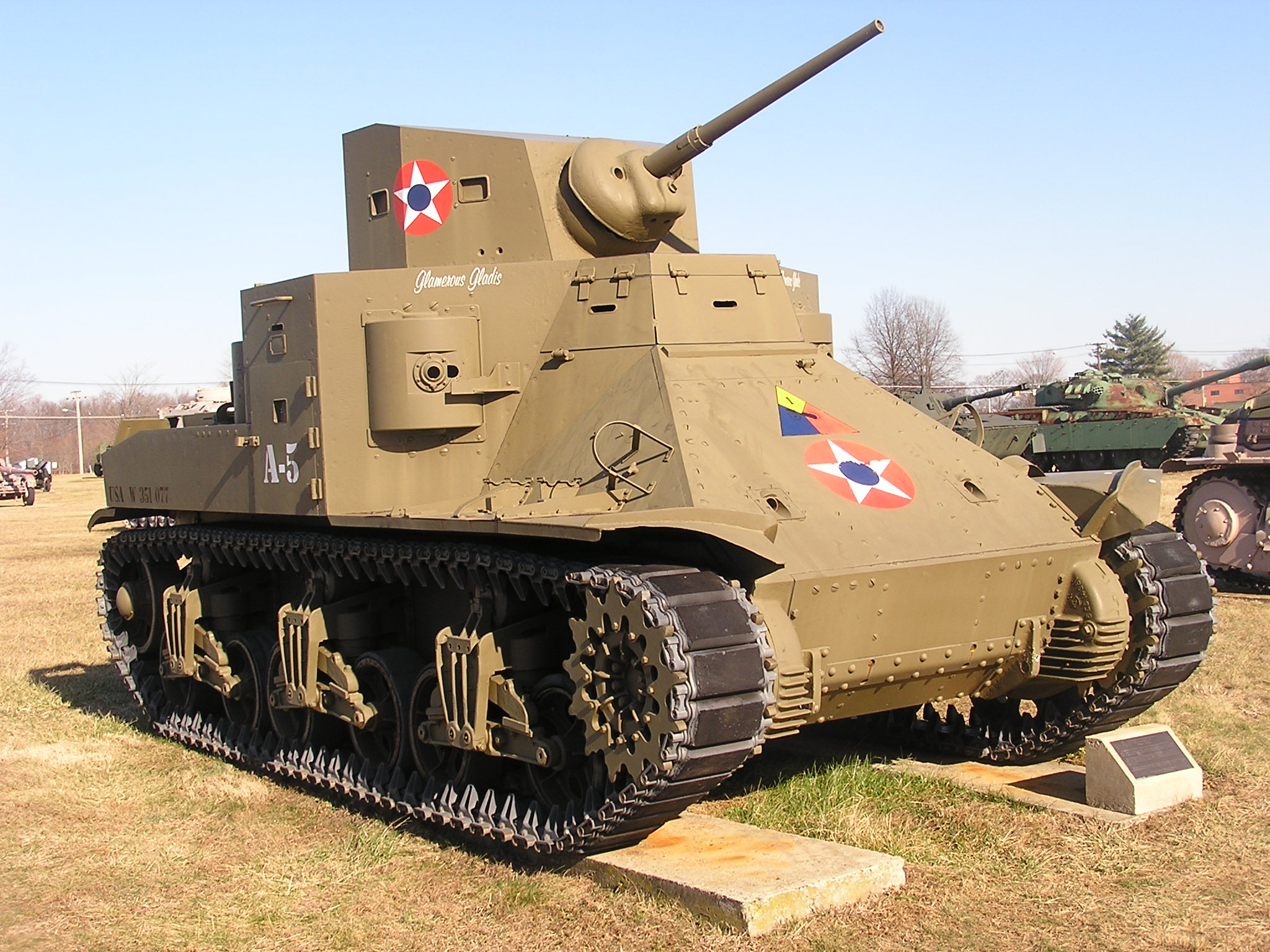
- The M2A1 Medium at Aberdeen Proving Ground in 2008
- Type: Medium tank
- Place of origin: United States

Service history
- In service: 1941–1945

Production history
- Manufacturer: Rock Island Arsenal
- Unit cost: $50,000 (1939 estimate) $33,500 (1940 contract)
- No. built: 18 M2s, 94 M2A1s
- Variants: M2, M2A1

Specifications
- Mass: 41,000 lb (18.7 metric tons)
- Length: 5.38 m (17 ft 8 in)
- Width: 2.59 m (8 ft 6 in)
- Height: 2.82 m (9 ft 3 in)
- Crew: 5 (commander/gunner, loader, driver, (2x) machine gunners)
- Armor: M2 6.4–32 mm (0.25–1.26 in); M2A1 6.4–51 mm (0.25–2.01 in)
- Main armament: 1× 37 mm Gun M3; 200 rounds
- Secondary armament: 7× (maximum 9) .30-06 Browning M1919 machine guns 12,250 rounds
- Engine: Wright R975 EC2 air-cooled radial gasoline 400/340 hp (298/253 kW)
- Suspension: Vertical volute spring suspension (VVSS)
- Fuel capacity: 473 liters (125 U.S. gal)
- Operational range: 210 km (130 mi)
- Maximum speed: 26 mph (42 km/h)

The M2 medium tank, officially Medium Tank, M2, was a United States Army medium tank that was first produced in 1939 by the Rock Island Arsenal, just prior to the commencement of the Second World War in Europe. Production was 18 M2 tanks, and 94 slightly improved M2A1 tanks, for a total of 112. Events in Western Europe rapidly demonstrated that the M2 was obsolete, and it was never used overseas in combat; it was, however, used for training purposes throughout the war.

The M2's features included an unusually large number of machine guns, bullet deflector plates, and sloped armor on the hull front (glacis plate). The main armament was a 37 mm (1.5 in) gun, with 32 mm (1.3 in) armor; the M2A1 had a 51 mm (2.0 in) gun mantlet. Some features of the M2 series, especially the suspension and powertrain, provided the basis for later, important U.S. tank designs including the M3 Lee, M4 Sherman and other armored fighting vehicles.

== Design ==
Rock Island Arsenal started work on a new medium tank, based on the design of the M2 light tank. Initially designated the T5, the redesigned model (with a 350 hp R-975 radial engine) was re-designated as the M2 Medium Tank in June, 1939. After the first 18 units had been produced at Rock Island Arsenal and evaluated by the Army, the upgraded M2A1 specification was approved with a redesigned turret and a more powerful engine.

The Medium Tank M2 was a larger development of the M2 light tank. Many components were common or used a similar design, including the tracks and vertical volute spring suspension which, with slight modifications, were later used on the M3 and M4 medium tanks. Twin-wheeled bogies were mounted externally, which saved internal space compared to other suspension designs. The rubber-bushed and rubber-shod track proved durable on roads. The initial M2 model was powered by an air-cooled Wright R-975 radial engine, originally designed for aircraft. For the M2A1, this engine was supercharged to provide an extra 50 hp (37 kW) for a total of 400 horsepower (300 kW), and designated as the R-975 C1 radial engine.

The M2 had a high superstructure, with a sponson-mounted machine gun in each corner. In addition, two more machine guns were fixed in the glacis plate and fired by the driver. Two additional .30-caliber machine guns could be mounted on pintles on either side of the turret for anti-aircraft use, bringing the total to nine. Surmounting the superstructure was a small revolving turret armed with a 37 mm gun M3 and a coaxial machine gun. The 37 mm gun could penetrate 46 mm (1.8 in) of face-hardened armor sloped 30° at a range of 500 yd (460 m), and 40 mm at 1,000 yd (910 m). This armament configuration was an intermediate between the sponson-mounted weapons of the Mark VIII Liberty tank of World War I vintage, and the combination of turreted cannon, coaxial machine gun and glacis-mounted machine gun that was almost universal in World War II medium tanks. The crew consisted of a tank commander, a driver and four gunners. The vehicle provided internal stowage for 200 rounds of 37 mm ammunition and up to 12,250 rounds of .30-caliber ammunition.

Bullet deflector plates were installed over the rear fenders. The idea behind these plates was that the tank could drive over a trench, and the rear sponson machine guns could then fire onto the plates; the bullets would deflect into the trench or the area directly behind the tank. Like the sponson machine guns themselves, the deflector plates turned out to be useless. However, the idea was used again on M5 light tanks in the Normandy campaign.

== Production ==
Chrysler was appointed to manage a new tank plant, the Detroit Arsenal Tank Plant, to manufacture the M2, and the US Government contracted on 15 August 1940 for 1,000 vehicles to be produced at a rate of 100 a month and to be delivered by August 1942 at a fixed price of $33,500 per tank. Events in Europe made it obvious that the M2 was obsolete, and the government modified the contract two weeks later, before production began. Instead of M2 medium tanks, the plant would now build 1,000 M3 medium tanks once they had been designed. In the interim production of the M2 was given to the Rock Island Arsenal, where 94 M2A1s were built up to August 1941, of which 88 in 1941. The M2A1 had slightly better armor and a slightly larger turret than the original M2, since it had the turret from the M3 light tank, with gun mantlet armor 2 inches (51 mm) thick.

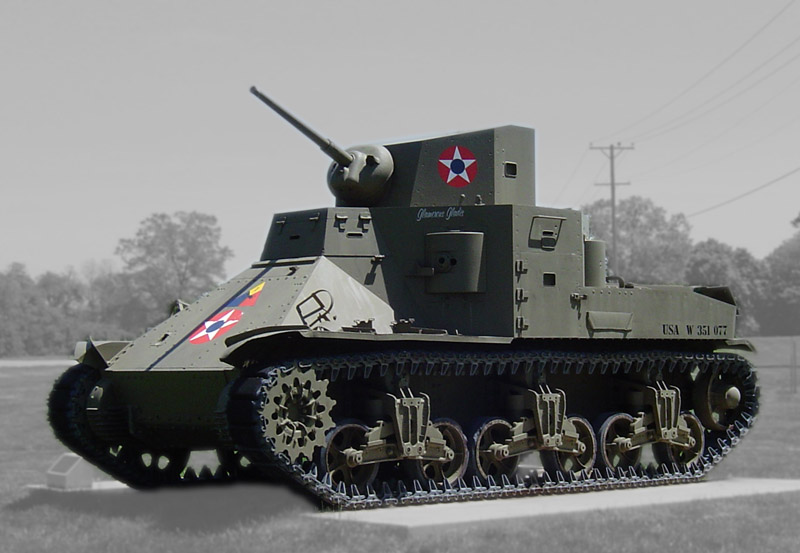
An M2A1 Medium Tank on display at Aberdeen Proving Grounds.

== Service ==
The M2 was already obsolete when it entered service. It compared poorly with contemporary European tanks, such as the French S-35 and German Panzer III. The 37 mm (1.5 in) main armament of the M2 was equivalent to the 37 mm (1.5 in) of the Panzer III but inferior to the 47 mm (1.9 in) of the S-35. By 1941, the Germans had begun upgrading their Panzer III with a 50 mm (2.0 in) L/42 gun, and the Soviets had fielded the vastly superior T-34, with a 76 mm (3.0 in) gun and a sloped 52 mm (2.0 in) glacis plate. Given this, the M2 was essentially a stopgap measure until more capable tanks like the M3 Lee and M4 Sherman came along in 1942–43. The ordnance office recommended in January 1942 that the M2 should only be used for training purposes, and they were never sent overseas to combat areas. The U.S. Army fielded the M2 and M2A1 with the 67th Infantry Regiment (medium tanks) and, subsequently, the 1st Armored Division's 69th Armored Regiment during intensive training maneuvers in the United States in 1941, and the M2 design continued to prove useful in a basic training role for tank crewmen. The trained crewmen from the 69th Armored were reassigned to provide cadres to new armored units as U.S. forces were rapidly expanded from 1942 to 1944.

The need for a new medium tank to match the German Panzer IV's 75 mm (2.95 in) turret gun led to the development of the M3 Lee, designed first to mount a 75 mm (2.95 in) gun in the right sponson. This configuration had been tested on an M2; the experimental vehicle was designated T5E2.

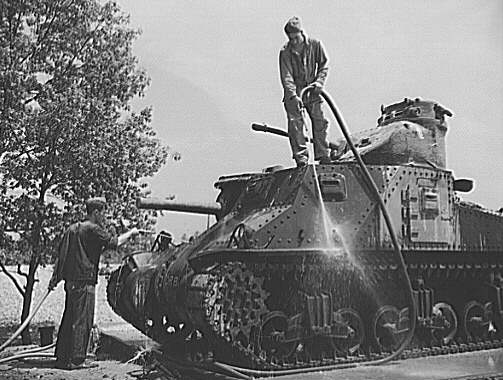
An M3 medium tank, the successor to the M2

== See also ==
- G-numbers

== Sources ==
- Chamberlain, Peter; Ellis, Chris (1981) [1969]. British and American Tanks of World War II. New York: Arco. ISBN 0-668-04304-0.
- Leland Ness (2002), Jane's World War II Tanks and Fighting Vehicles: A Complete Guide, HarperCollins, ISBN 0-00-711228-9
- Stout, Wesley W. Tanks are Mighty Fine Things 1946; Chrysler Corporation.
- Zaloga, Steven. Armored Thunderbolt, The US Army Sherman in World War II. 2008; Stackpole Books. ISBN 978-0-8117-0424-3.
- Lemons, Charles. Organization and Markings of United States Armored Units 1918-1941.2004; Schiffer. ISBN 0-7643-2098-X.
