= Mark VIII tank =

British/American WWI tank

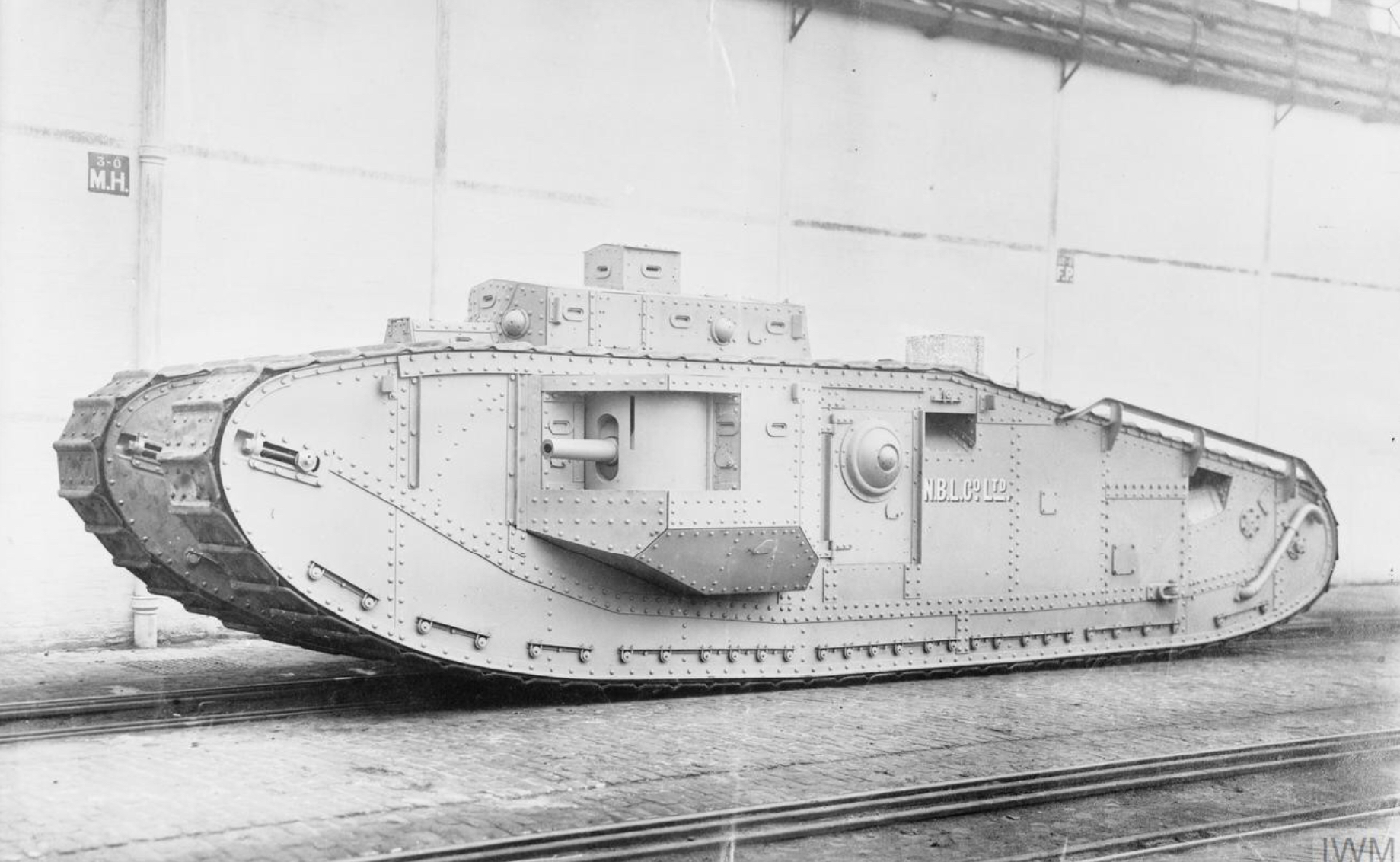
- A British Mark VIII
- Type: Heavy tank
- Place of origin: United Kingdom, United States

Production history
- Designed: 1917
- Manufacturer: UK: North British Locomotive Company; US: Rock Island Arsenal
- Produced: 1918–1920
- No. built: 125

Specifications
- Mass: 37 long tons (38 t) (dry weight)
- Length: 34 ft 2 in (10.41 m)
- Width: 11 ft 8 in (3.56 m); 9 ft (2.7 m) sponsons in
- Height: 10 ft 3 in (3.12 m)
- Crew: 10 to 12 crew members, 1 commander, 1 driver, 2 gunners, 2 loaders, 2 machine gunners, 1 mechanic and possibly more
- Armor: 16 mm (0.63 in) maximum
- Main armament: two QF 6 pdr 6 cwt Hotchkiss (57mm - 2.24in) guns
- Secondary armament: seven 7.92 mm Hotchkiss machine guns or five M1917 Browning machine guns
- Engine: V-12 Liberty or V-12 Ricardo; 300 hp (220 kW)
- Power/weight: 7.89 hp/tonne (5.79 kW/t)
- Suspension: unsprung
- Operational range: 50 mi (80 km)
- Maximum speed: 5.25 mph (8.45 km/h) governed to 6.25 mph (10.06 km/h) maximum

The Mark VIII tank also known as the Liberty or The International was a British-American tank design of the First World War intended to overcome the limitations of the earlier British designs and be a collaborative effort to equip France, the UK and the US with a single heavy tank design.

Production at a site in France was expected to take advantage of US industrial capacity to produce the automotive elements, with the UK producing the armoured hulls and armament. The planned production levels would have equipped the Allied armies with a very large tank force that would have broken through the German defensive positions in the planned offensive for 1919. In practice, manufacture was slow and only a few vehicles were produced before the end of the war in November 1918.

After the war, 100 vehicles assembled in the US were used by the US Army until more advanced designs replaced them in 1932. A few tanks which had not been scrapped by the start of World War II were offered to Canada for training purposes.

== Early development ==
As the First World War progressed, the industrial production capacity of the Entente was taxed to the limit. Of the Allies, only Great Britain and France had been major industrial nations in 1914 and the latter had lost 70% of its heavy industry when the Germans overran that part of Lorraine that they had not already occupied in 1871. The output in Britain was limited by labour shortages due to the manpower demand of the armed forces and a rocketing national debt.

When the United States of America declared war on Germany on 6 April 1917, many in Britain hoped this event would solve all these problems. The two men directly responsible for British tank production, Eustace Tennyson d'Eyncourt and Lieutenant-Colonel Albert Gerald Stern, initially considered sending a delegation to the United States immediately, to convince the new ally to start production of a British tank design. After some reflection they decided it was best to leave the initiative to the Americans. Stern did contact the American Military Attaché in London immediately after war was declared. In June 1917 the first American approaches were made, but not by the US Army as they had expected. The US Navy wanted the most modern tanks for its US Marine Corps. At that moment the current British tank project was the Mark VI. It was designed with existing British industrial capacity in mind, posing limits that might be overcome by larger American production facilities. Stern therefore pretended that an even more advanced project had already been in existence which he called the Mark VIII (there was also a much more conventional Mark VII project). He invited the Americans to participate and contribute as much as they would like to its design. The Navy was on the brink of sending a team of engineers to Britain when the American Department of War was informed of developments by the US Military Attaché in London. It ordered the project to be shifted to the Army and selected Major H. W. Alden – in peacetime he had been an industrial expert – to go to the UK to work with the Mechanical Warfare Department design team at Dollis Hill on the first drawings of the new tank. He arrived in London on the 3 October, to discover that a lot of design work had already been done by Lieutenant G J Rackham, who had been sent to the Front to see for himself how the current designs performed in the dismal conditions then encountered at the battlefield in Flanders.

== "International Tank" ==
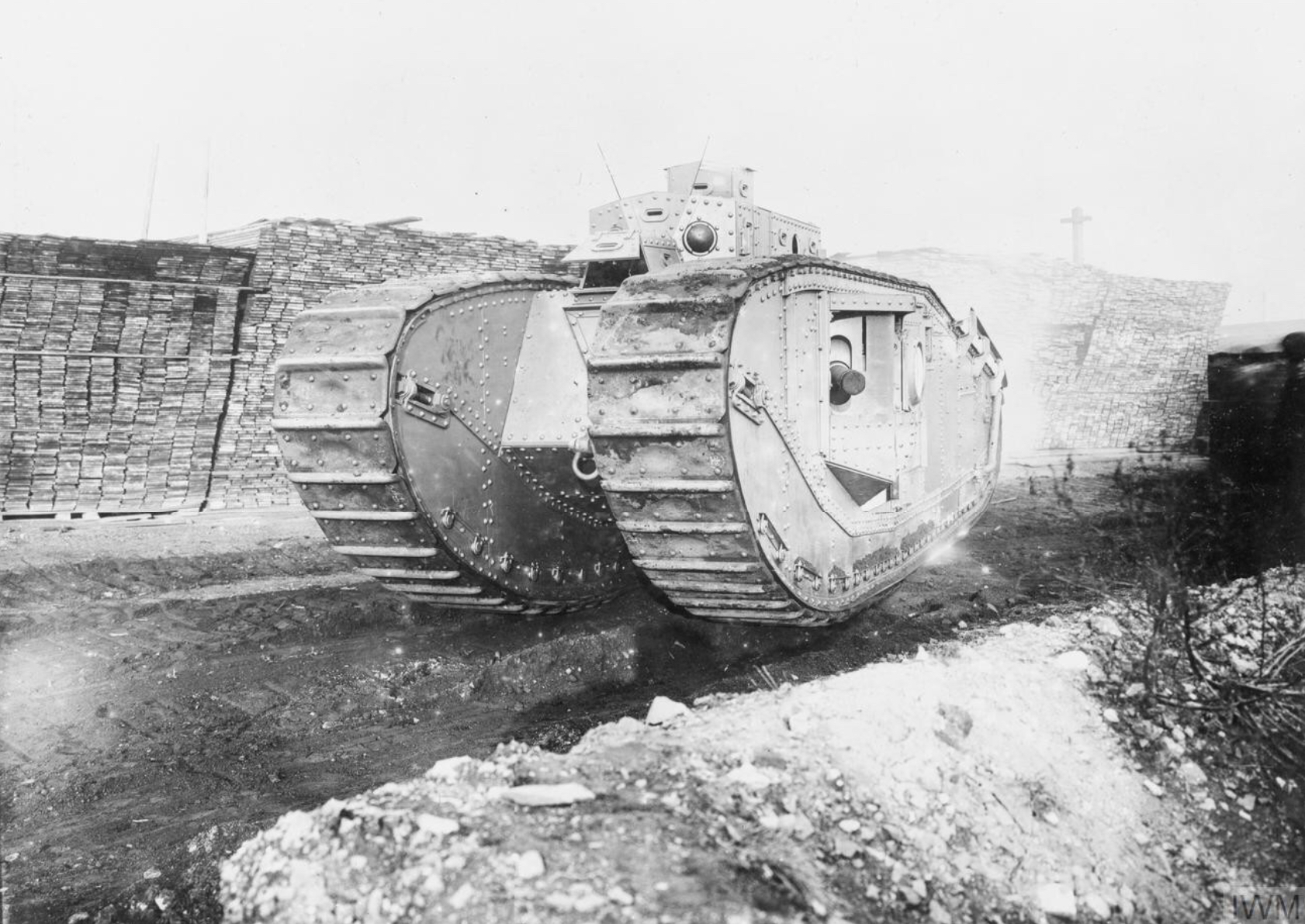
View of front

The US Army had set up headquarters in France. In September it decided to form its own tank corps with 25 tank battalions including five heavy tank battalions. To equip the heavy units, Major James A. Drain – a staff officer to General Pershing and responsible for initial planning of the tank force – provisionally ordered 600 Mark VI tanks (then under development) from the British in October 1917. The Army tried to convince the Department of War to divert all available tanks to the Army, leading to a conflict with the Navy (the first of many to come over this issue). This posed serious problems for the British government. It now seemed that American involvement in the war would mean a lesser number of tanks available for the British forces. Also on 4 February 1917 binding agreements had been made with the French about tank production. These had to be renegotiated.

Winston Churchill, the new Minister of Munitions, had just been forced to fire Stern as director of the Mechanical Supply Department (Controller of the Mechanical Warfare Department) because of his mistakes in handling the Mark IV project, leading to enormous production delays. In pushing production through in the early days he had upset civil and military authorities. Stern was appointed in September to the new position of "Commissioner for Mechanical Warfare (Overseas and Allies Branch)" in order to coordinate tank production with the US and France. Stern went to France to meet the French Minister of Munitions, Louis Loucheur and the American commander-in-chief, John Pershing. Loucheur made it clear from the beginning that France had nothing to offer in terms of existing production facilities. This came as no surprise to Stern who had already prepared an "International Plan" of ten points (in fact a bilateral agreement between the US and Britain) that he now managed to get accepted by the Americans. He submitted this to Churchill on the 11 November. Its main points included (using the original terminology):

- The incorporation of a partnership between the US and Great Britain for the production of 1,500 heavy tanks to be erected in France.
- The supply of a number of these tanks to France to further the higher purpose of Allied unity, should she require them. (Britain hoped France would produce its own Char 2C in sufficient numbers, Loucheur already knew this was unlikely to happen).
- France might supply an erecting shop, if convenient; in any case it might be wiser to build a new one (so a completely new factory would have to be built in France).
- A joint supply of components. Britain would supply guns, ammunition, and armour; the USA engines, transmissions, forgings, and chains (employing US car industry).
- The design would be based on British experience and American ideas and resources, and eliminate most of the faults in current tanks in power, loading, and trench crossing.
- Major Alden would collaborate to finish the working drawings before Christmas enjoying full cooperation of the British; the design was to be approved by both nations.
- Unskilled labour might be provided by imported Chinese; the French government ensured their local accommodation.
- Production would begin in April 1918 and finally reach 300 a month (so the number of 1,500 was only preliminary).
- The project would have high priority in regards raw materials, labour, factories, and transport.
- Management would be in the hands of two Commissioners, one British (Stern himself) and one American; but the French could appoint their own if their interests were concerned.

The plan already contained a specification: the tank should have a 300 hp (220 kW) engine, weigh 38.8 tons (39.5 tonnes) and have a trench crossing capacity of 14 feet (4.3 m). The 11 November briefing included the first use of the word "Liberty" for the tank which was taken from the engine chosen.

The first design conference took place on 4 December at GHQ in France and Churchill approved the plan soon afterwards. It was made into a formal treaty signed by the British Foreign Secretary Arthur Balfour and the US Ambassador Walter Hines Page on 19 January 1918. The treaty specified the programme in great detail. The first 1,500 tanks had to be made by the end of the year and the factory should be capable of expansion to 1,200 a month. Both goals were very ambitious given the fact there was neither a completed design nor a factory and that British tank production would in fact be 150 a month during 1918.

The United States would supply: the engine; radiator; fan; piping; silencer; lighting; dynamo; battery; propeller shaft; transmission, including gearbox; brakes; roller sprockets; gear shift and brake control; track links and pins; rear track sprockets, hub and shafts; front idler hub and shafts; track roller, track spindles and bushings.

Britain would supply: bullet and bomb-proof plates; structural members; track shoes and rollers; guns, machine guns and mountings; ammunition racks and ammunition.

The agreed price was to be £5,000 per vehicle. In December 1917 the Mark VI order was cancelled ensuring that the Mark VIII would be the new standard Allied weapon.

== Description ==
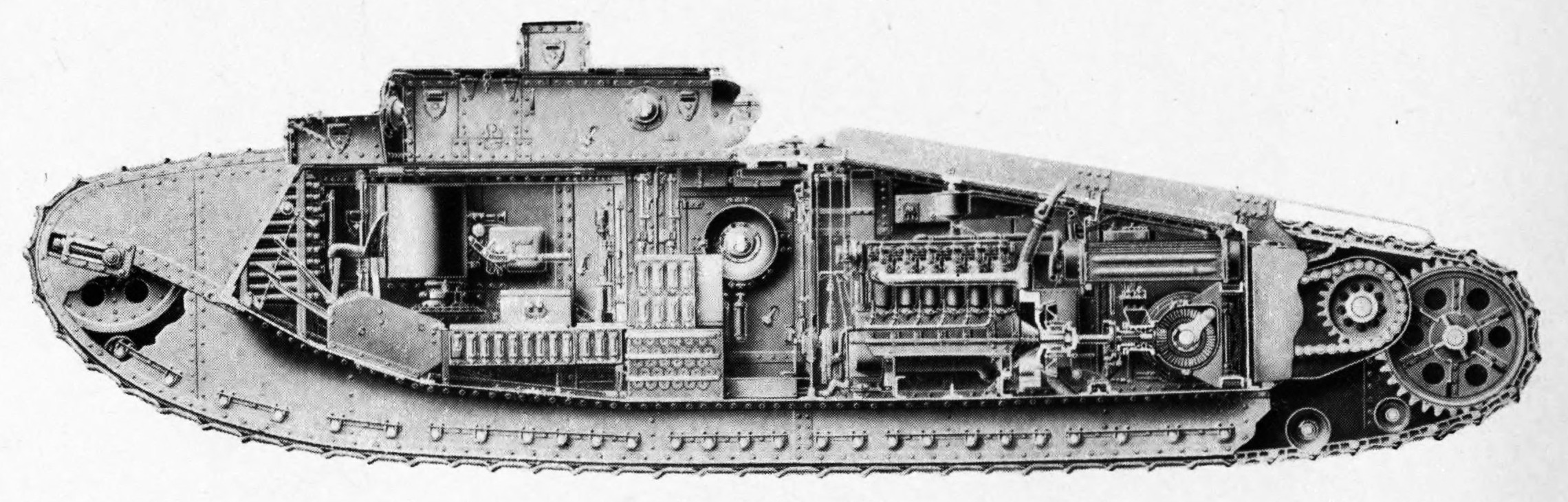
The internal fittings of the Mark VIII

The Mark VIII kept many of the general features of the Mark I-V series: it had their typical high track run and no revolving turret but two sponsons, one on each side of the tank, armed with a 6-pounder (57 mm) gun. But it also resembled the Mark VI-project in that it had more rounded and wider tracks and a large superstructure on top directly beneath the front of which the driver was seated. An innovative feature was the departure from the concept of the box tank with its single space into which all accessories were crammed. The Mark VIII was compartimentalised with a separate engine room at the back. This vastly improved fighting conditions as a bulkhead protected the crew against the deafening engine noise, noxious fumes and heat.

There were no machine guns in the sponsons, only the 6-pounders each manned by a gunner and loader. The side machine guns were to the rear of the sponsons mounted in the hull doors. Major Alden had designed the sponsons to be retractable (they could be swung in at the rear by the crew, being pivoted at the front), to reduce the width of the vehicle if enemy obstacles were encountered. Five more machine guns were in the superstructure: two at the front—left and right next to the driver—and one on each of the other sides. As there was no machine gun position covering the back of the tank there was a dead angle vulnerable to infantry attack. To solve this problem a triangular steel deflector plate was attached. The rear superstructure machine gunner could use it to deflect his fire down into that area behind the tank. The tank carried 208 shells and 13,848 machine gun rounds, mostly in a large ammunition locker in the centre which formed a platform on which the commander stood behind the driver observing the battlefield through a cupola with four vision slits. Later the side superstructure guns were removed on US tanks.

The twelfth crew member was the mechanic, seated next to the 300 hp Liberty V-12 (or in British tanks Ricardo V-12) petrol engine) cooled by a large horizontal radiator. Three armoured fuel tanks at the rear held 200 Imperial gallons (240 US gallons, or 909 litres) of fuel giving a range of 89 km. The transmission used a planetary gearbox giving two speeds in either forward or reverse. Top speed was 5.25 mph (8.45 km/h).

To improve its trench crossing ability to 4.88 m the vehicle had a very elongated shape. The track length was 34 ft 2 in (10.41 m) but even though the hull width was an impressive nominal 3.76 m, the actual length-width ratio of the tracks was very poor as that width included the sponsons. Combined with wide tracks it proved difficult to turn the tank. During testing many tracks twisted and broke in a turn and it was decided to use longer, stronger 13.25-inch (337 mm) links made of hardened cast armour plate, stiffened by webs formed by recesses in the track plate. Another effect of the narrow hull was that the fighting compartment was also very narrow. This was made worse by the fact that now the gap between the double track frames at each side was very wide; earlier types had only the tracks themselves widened. Nevertheless, the tank was supposed to accommodate another twenty infantry men in full gear if necessary. In absolute terms the vehicle was very large: at 10 ft 3 in (3.12 m) tall the Mark VIII was the second largest operational tank in history, after the Char 2C. However its weight was only 38.3 long tons (38.9 t) fitted for battle as the armour plate was thin with a thickness of 16 mm on the front and sides—a slight improvement over the Mark V but very thin by later standards. The roof and bottom of the hull were protected by only 6 mm thick armour plate, leaving the tank very vulnerable to mortar shells and landmines.

== Production ==
The French government hoped to receive 700 Mark VIIIs for free, as the French superheavy tank, the Char 2C, could not be produced in sufficient numbers, if at all. However, suffering from a lack of manpower and raw materials the French were not forthcoming in providing any facilities for the production of the International Tank. Soon the Americans decided to build a brand new assembly factory at Neuvy-Pailloux 200 miles south of Paris, contracting a British company. Far from producing its first tank in April, the factory was not even finished by June. In August they contracted another British firm. It finished the factory in November, by which point the war had already ended; not a single tank would be built there.

There were also serious delays in the production of the components. The Liberty aero engine with its expensive drawn-steel cylinders was redesigned with cheaper cast iron cylinders. These redesigned engines were only produced in October. In spite of these delays, there were plans to produce a further 1,500 tanks in the United States on top of the shared production in France. This was not possible due to lack of armour and guns so the extra production was to be in France as well.

The British finished the prototype hull, made of unhardened steel, in July and sent it to the United States. On arrival it transpired that no mass-produced parts were ready to finish the prototype, so the Locomobile Automobile Company in Bridgeport, Connecticut made these all by hand, completing the first vehicle on the 28 September. Testing began on 31 October. Only then was the armament shipped from Britain, and two guns and ten Hotchkiss machine guns were fitted.

Testing was finished after the war and it was decided to build 100 vehicles in the USA; these were constructed in 1919 and 1920 by the Rock Island Arsenal for $35,000 each. The US bought 100 complete sets of parts for the hull from the British, the whole amount that had been completed.

Meanwhile, the British government had decided to start their own production in Britain. One thousand, four hundred and fifty vehicles were ordered from the North British Locomotive Company, William Beardmore and Company and Metropolitan, to use a 300 hp (220 kW) V12 Ricardo engine instead of the Liberty. Only the first managed to produce anything by the end of the war with seven vehicles built. The mild steel prototype with a Rolls-Royce engine was tested on 11 November, the day of the Armistice.

From parts already produced a further 24 vehicles were completed after the war. Five were sent to the training centre at Bovington in Dorset, and the others went straight to the scrap dealer.

== Mark VIII* ==
During 1918, the then prevalent preoccupation with trench crossing capabilities led to preparations being made for the production of an even longer tank: the Mark VIII* (Star). The hull was to be lengthened a full three meters: four feet (1.2 m) at the front and six feet (1.8 m) at the back. This way it should be able to cross a trench 18 feet (5.5 m) wide. To ensure that the tank could turn at all, despite its critically high length-width ratio, the bottom profile of the tracks would be more strongly curved, so that a smaller part of the track would touch the ground. Ground pressure would have increased however, as total weight reached 42.5 tons (43.2 tonnes). If the tank had sunk into soft ground somewhat, it's questionable whether it would have been able to make a turn. No prototype was built.

== Operational history ==
The American Liberty tanks equipped a single unit: the 67th Infantry Regiment (Tank), based in Aberdeen, Maryland. The curious designation of the unit had its origin in the fact that since 1920, by law, all tanks had to be part of the Infantry branch. The two machine gun positions at the sides of the superstructure were eliminated, so the crew could be reduced to ten. Water-cooled M1917 Browning machine guns were used. Despite many modifications, the vehicles suffered from overheating and poor reliability, causing a prejudice in the Army against the use of heavy tanks. From 1932 onward they were phased out; all were in storage by 1934. In 1940, Canada had a lack of training tanks and were offered the remaining tanks at scrap value, but the Canadians instead opted to purchase M1917 light tanks.

== Surviving examples ==
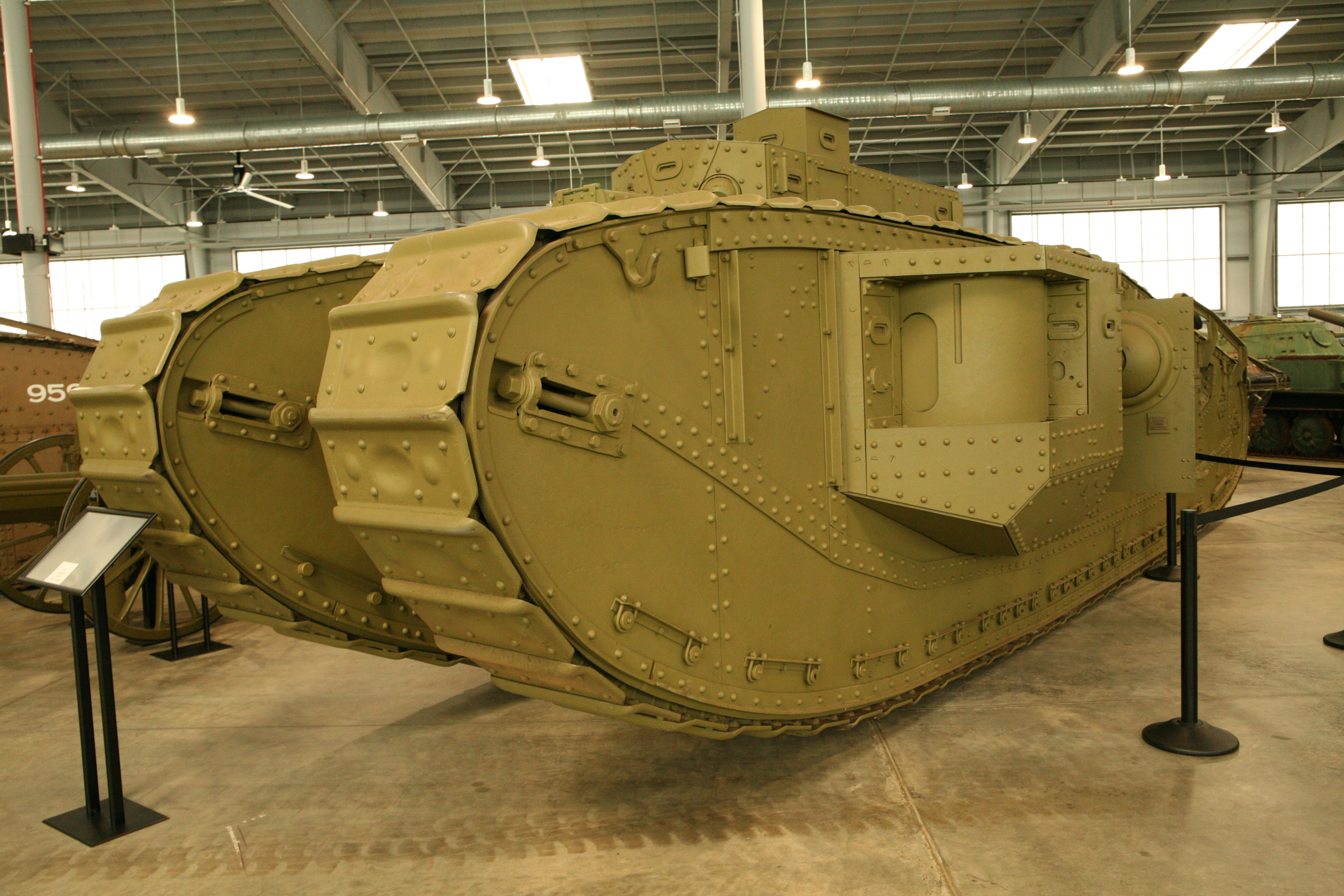
Mark VIII at the U.S. Army Armor & Cavalry Collection at Fort Benning in 2023

- A Liberty tank was displayed In the Post Museum at Fort Meade in Maryland. The tank was made in 1920 at the Rock Island Arsenal, Illinois. It was assigned to the 301st Tank Battalion (Heavy), later redesignated the 17th Tank Battalion (Heavy). Throughout most of 1921–1922, Major Dwight D. Eisenhower commanded this unit. This tank was moved to the U.S. Army Armor & Cavalry Collection, Fort Benning in late 2022. It is now on prominent display inside the Tankodrome at Fort Benning, GA, in the Armor Center Training Support Facility (TSF).
- A second American Liberty tank was at the Aberdeen Proving Ground in Aberdeen, Maryland; it was moved to the U.S. Army Armor and Cavalry Collection at Fort Benning, Georgia in 2014, and was inside until 2021. The interior has extensive damage from water/rust, although plans are in place for structural repairs. The tank was moved subsequently in May 2021, back to its original construction location at the Rock Island Arsenal in Rock Island, Illinois, where it was placed on exhibit in 2024.
- The British never allocated their Mark VIIIs to a tank unit; a single vehicle survives at the Bovington Tank Museum.

The tank appearing in the 1989 Indiana Jones and the Last Crusade movie was a replica vehicle made from an excavator, following the hull shape of the Mark VIII but with a turret added.

== See also ==
- G-numbers
- Drain, Jr., James A. (10 December 2013). "Chapter 7: Work With Tanks". In Bardenwerper, Sr., Mark L. (ed.). Single Handed. Self Published. ISBN 978-1470032760.

== Bibliography ==
- Preliminary Handbook of the Mark VIII Tank
- Hunnicutt, Richard Pearce (1988). Firepower: A History of the American Heavy Tank. Novato, California: Presidio Press. ISBN 0-89141-304-9.
