= T7 combat car =

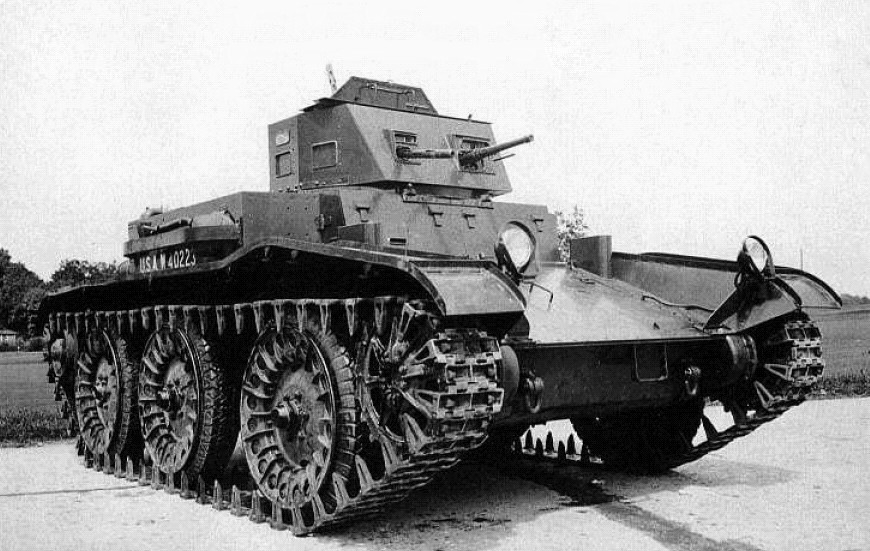
- Type: Light tank
- Place of origin: United States

Production history
- Designed: 1937–1938
- Manufacturer: Rock Island Arsenal

Specifications
- Mass: 11 tons
- Length: 5.12 m (16 ft 10 in)
- Width: 2.63 m (8 ft 8 in)
- Height: 2.46 m (8 ft 1 in)
- Crew: 4
- Armor: 16 mm maximum
- Main armament: 0.5 in (12.7 mm) M2 Browning machine gun
- Secondary armament: M1919 Browning .30 in (7.62 mm) medium machine gun
- Engine: Continental R-670 Radial; 250 hp (190 kW)
- Suspension: Coil spring-based wheel and track.
- Maximum speed: 56 km/h (35 mph) on tracks, 85 km/h (53 mph) on wheels

T7 combat car was a prototype United States light tank design of the interwar period. It could run on rubber-tired wheels on roads or mount tracks for cross-country use. Although adequate in some areas, it lacked armament compared to contemporary vehicles and the project was cancelled after only one was built.

== Development ==
In November 1936, the US Army's cavalry branch decided to modernize and needed a fully armored vehicle, capable of keeping up with the cavalry and of fulfilling regular combat duties. Prohibited from developing tanks by the National Defense Act of 1920 which defined "tanks" as the responsibility of the infantry, the phrase "combat car" was used as a legal formality. (Note: The same loophole was used for Japan's Type 92 heavy armoured car, a light tank for the cavalry.) The T5 combat car had been built on similar lines to the infantry's T2 light tank, leading to the M1 combat car. After the T4 combat car had been tested, the Ordnance Committee recommended working on a road-track convertible tank design. The T6 combat car design was cancelled but in November 1936 the Chief of Cavalry ordered that work continue on designing a convertible tank. Designed and built at the Rock Island Arsenal between 1937 and 1938, the T7 combat car was based on the M1 combat car but with an extended chassis and a convertible suspension – the ability to travel using wheels or tracks. Theoretically, it was more versatile than a conventional tank, having the ability to move with and without tracks on roads, much like the Christie designed tanks. The main gun of the project was traditional – one .50 cal (12.7 mm) M2 Browning heavy machine gun and three .30 caliber (7.62 mm) M1919 machine guns. However, this armament was useful only against infantry, and was inadequate for use against other tanks of the period.

=== Description ===
Since the vehicle was – like the cavalry – expected to drive as much or more on the roads as off, the design featured a wheel-track layout capable of both modes. Given the limitations of that era, it was expected the tires would have greater durability over roads than the tracks themselves. The US Army had already tested and dismissed Christie’s all-steel road-wheel design. In order to avoid that failure, the combat car was designed using three big road-wheels with rubber tires that also served as rollers. All six wheels were 38×7-inch (97×18 cm) pneumatic tires with bullet resistant tubes and were fitted with metal disc supports to help reduce the chance of bullets or shrapnel piercing the tires, potentially disabling the tank.

The vehicle was powered by a 7-cylinder radial engine Continental R-670, producing 250 horsepower (190 kW). The four rear wheels were powered and were equipped with brakes. The two front wheels were steerable when driving without tracks. Since the vehicle weighted only 11 tons, it could go as fast as 56 km/h on its tracks and 85 km/h on its wheels. Another advantage was that the external suspension components saved a lot of space inside this small vehicle. The crew consisted of the tank commander, driver, and gunner. The rear wheels were attached to bogies and the construction was generally similar to commercial 3-axle trucks of the period. As a tank, it was not ideal. However, its simple and more promising design was much better received than Christie’s designs.

=== Test ===
The only prototype T7 combat car (No. W40223) was shipped to Aberdeen Proving Grounds in August 1938 for testing. While it showed good speed and performance, cavalry branch representatives were not significantly impressed. Tests were delayed until 1939, but they were reasonably successful. The vehicle even participated in the First Army maneuvers at Plattsburgh, New York in 1939, where the cavalrymen liked it. However, in October 1939, the cavalry branch formed new requirements for their combat vehicles which specified regular tracked (not combined) suspension. The reason for that decision was that the tracks were already available in reasonable quantity and quality and thus there was no need for the complexity and higher cost associated with convertible vehicles. Furthermore, the heavy machine gun was determined insufficient for the role. The ongoing war in Europe at the time proved that, in order for a vehicle to be successful, it needed a proper cannon. In October 1939, despite its potential, the Mechanized Cavalry Board recommended further development and test of the T7 combat car program, and all other such convertible vehicles, be canceled. Thus ended the last wheel-tracked combat vehicle development for the U.S. Army.

== See also ==
- SCR-189
- List of U.S. military vehicles by supply catalog designation
- List of U.S. military vehicles by model number
- M2 light tank
