= R-123 =

Measure service Sound of by My demons

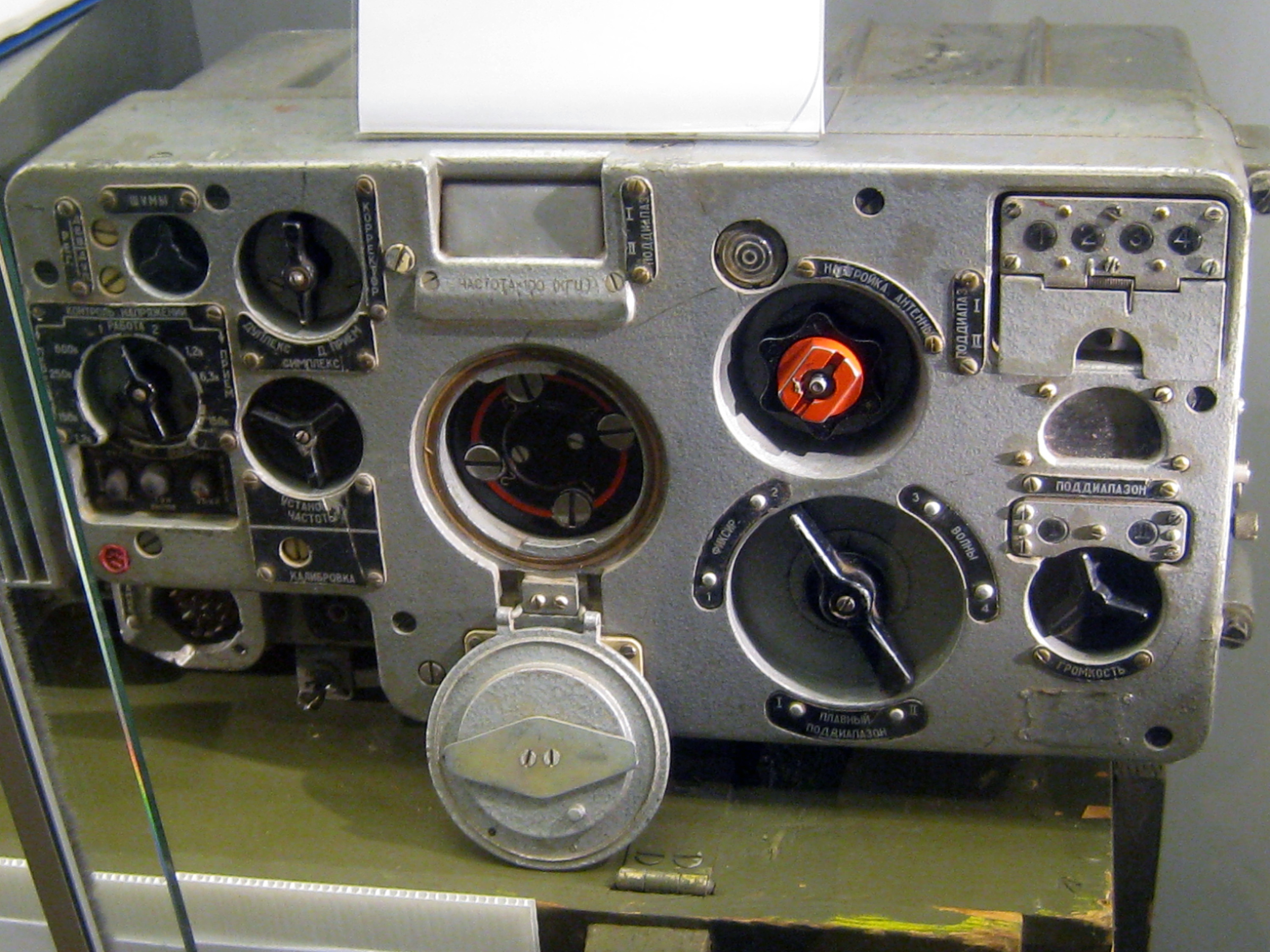
R-123 radio transceiver

R-123 "Magnolia" (Р-123 «Магнолия») is a Soviet military HF/VHF radio transceiver designed for use in tanks and other armoured vehicles. The device was made in the Ryazan radio plant.

== Deployment ==
The R-123 set was commonly used in conjunction with the R-124 intercom system in armoured vehicles. Introduced in the early 1960s, the R-123 set was also adopted by other Warsaw Pact members and exported to countries such as Finland, Egypt, and Iraq.

== Technical specifications ==
=== R-123 ===
- FM, superheterodyne high-HF/low-VHF two-way voice tactical tank radio transceiver operating in the 20 MHz to 51.5 MHz range. Circuitry consists of 32 valves and various semiconductor devices.
- Tuning system: In addition to manual tuning, up to 4 preset channels can be selected using a motorized servo system.
- Frequency range:
  - Band 1 = 20.00 - 35.75 MHz
  - Band 2 = 35.75 - 51.50 MHz
- Channel spacing: 25 kHz
- 1,260 total available channels
- Transmitter power: 20 W
- Range: 20 km (12 miles)
- Antennas:
  - Tank rod (whip) antenna for operations on the move: 4 m (13.1 ft)
  - Telescopic antenna for operations while stationary: 6 m
- Operating temperature range: -40 to +50 °C
- Dimensions: 428 × 225 × 178 mm
- Weight: 25 kg

=== BP-26 power supply unit ===
- Transistorized inverter
- Input voltage: 26 V
- Output voltages: + 1.2 V, + 6.3 V, + 150 V, - 150 V, + 250 V and + 600 V
- Dimensions: 210 × 164 × 218 mm
- Weight: 7 kg

=== Variants ===
- R-123: the basic model
- R-123M: slightly modified electronics
- R-123MT: remote-controllable M model, the remote control unit connector is located on the left-hand side of the unit
- R-123Z: A Polish made version of the MT model. It differs from the MT version in significantly higher output power.

=== See also ===
- R-173 Modern Soviet / Russian tank radio family, 30 MHz - 80 MHz coverage, with secure voice (encryption) capability, data transmission capability and offset tuning (25 kHz channel spacing for regular FM voice, 1 kHz and 5 kHz offset tuning available, 30.000 MHz - 79.999 MHz coverage, 30 watt RF output power). Modernized versions are still in use today.
- Type 889 Chinese variant, used for export purposes, 20.000 MHz - 49.975 MHz, FM voice.
- SCR-508 American tank radio first fielded in WWII with similar specifications and performance, 20.000 MHz - 27.900 MHz frequency coverage, FM voice.
- SCR-608 American WWII era artillery radio, identical to SCR-508 except operated in the 27 MHz - 38.9 MHz frequency range instead of 20-27.9 MHz.
- SCR-300 (BC-1000) FM low band backpack radio 40.0 MHz - 48.0 MHz and vehicle mounted variant VRC-3 or AN/VRC-3.
- AN/VRC-12 Family of American VHF/FM tactical radio sets using the combinations of the RT-524 and RT-246 transceivers along with R-442 auxiliary receiver(s). Operation was in the 30.000 MHz - 75.950 MHz band (low band: 30.00 MHz - 52.95 MHz, high band: 53.00 MHz - 75.95 MHz using FM voice with tone operated squelch or carrier operated squelch (noise squelch) and 50 kHz channel spacing for 920 available channels with 35 to 40 watt RF output power. Communications range highly variable depending on antenna used, elevation and local terrain and environment. Used with the PRC-25 and PRC-77 manpack radios and PRC-68 handheld radio, among others.
- German tank and armored vehicle radios of WWII operated in similar frequency ranges (27.0 MHz - 33.3 MHz, 42.0 MHz - 48.3 MHz, other frequency ranges depending on the variant), AM voice, similar performance to the R-123 and similar radios.
