= SCR-193 =

World War II U.S. military radio set

The SCR-193 was a series of Signal Corps Radio sets used by the U.S. armed forces in World War II.

The SCR-193-A, SCR-193-B, SCR-193-C, SCR-193-D and SCR-193-E radio sets were designed for installation in American military vehicles for the purpose of providing intervehicular communication whether the vehicles are stationary or moving. They were designed for use in M2A3 light tank, M1 scout car, M1A1 combat car, M3A1 scout car, and 1/4 ton command truck, respectively.

== See also ==
- Radio Tractor
- Signal Corps Radio
- SCR-189
- Crystal radio
