= Six-ton tank =

Six-ton tank may refer to

- Vickers 6-Ton
- M1917 tank, US-built copy of the French Renault FT light tank of World War One.
