= SCR-189 =

US Army radio set

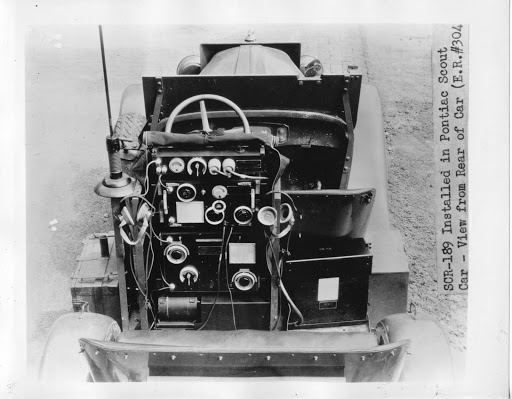
- SCR-189 in T1 Scout Car
- Type: Vehicle radio
- Place of origin: United States

Service history
- In service: standardized 1933
- Used by: US Army

Production history
- Designed: 1932
- Variants: 1

Specifications
- Armor: none
- Main armament: none

The SCR-189 was a mobile Signal Corps Radio tested by the United States Army before World War II. It was designed for armored forces, and mounted in the Six Ton Tank M1917. The original production run of these tanks included 50 "radio tanks" but the original radio components are unknown, so what or how many tanks were fitted with the SCR-189 also appears to be unknown.

== Use ==
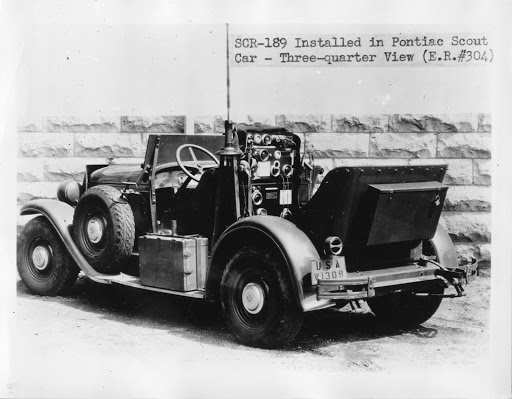
Scr-189 in T1 Pontiac Scout Car

An early tactical vehicle radio, it was the first Army set to utilize the Superheterodyne receiver. As the M1917 tank was phased out, the new M1 Combat Car and M2 Light Tank were equipped with SCR-189's. The SCR-189 was replaced by the SCR-245 in 1937.

== Components ==
- BC-175 Receiver
- BC-176 Transmitter CW/voice, 2.2 to 2.6 kHz (136.27 to 115.30 km) at 7.5 watts, range 8 miles (13 km)
- BC-177 Control box
- BC-206 Control box
- PE-48 Power supply
- Battery box BX-3 (Battery BA-27)

== Variants ==
- SCR-190 Receiver only set

== See also ==
- Radio Tractor
- Signal Corps Radio
- SCR-193
- Crystal radio
