= SCR-245 =

WW2-era US Army radio

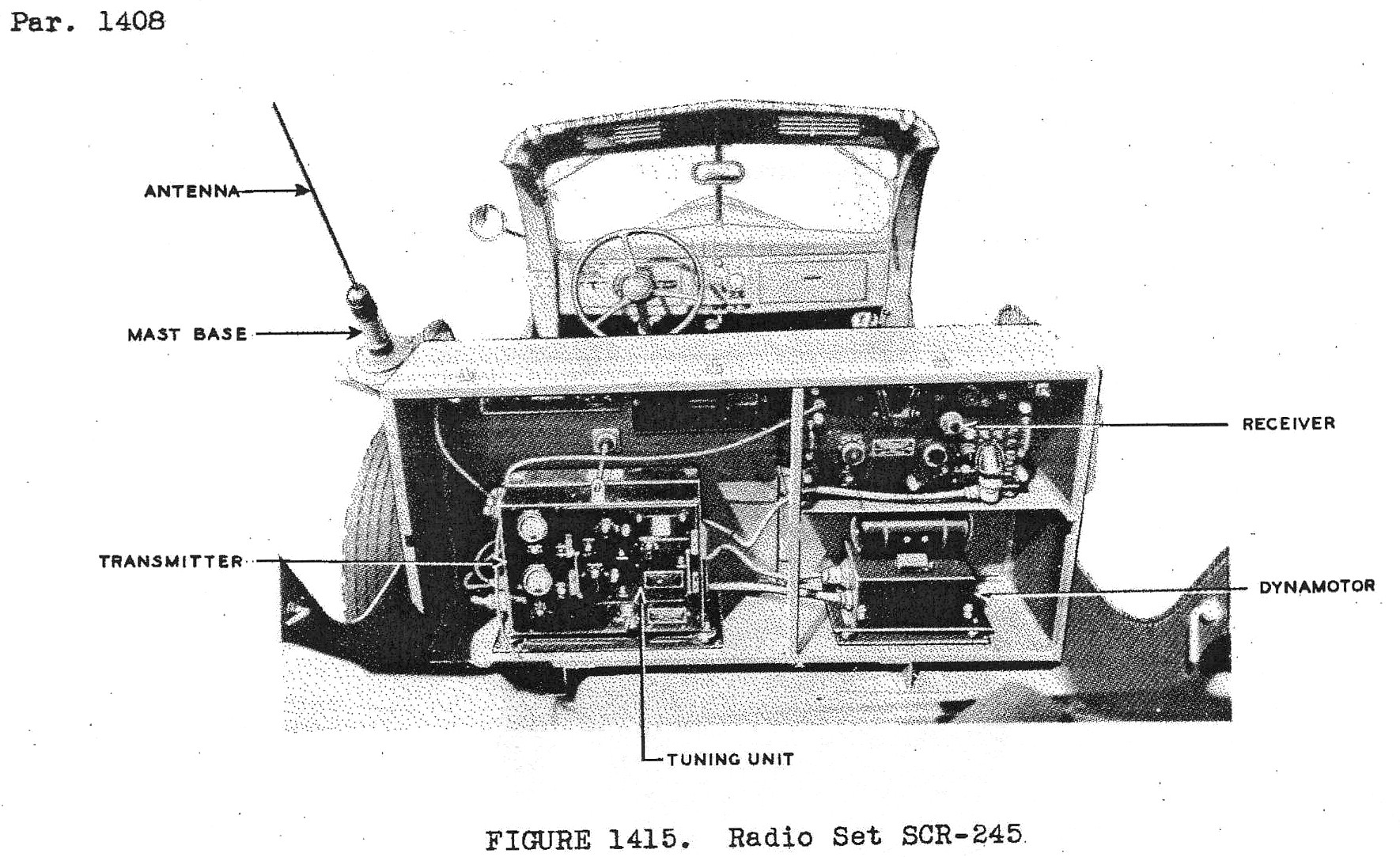
- SCR-245 mounted in Dodge VC-2 radio command car
- Type: Vehicle Radio
- Place of origin: United States

Service history
- In service: 1937
- Used by: US Army
- Wars: World War II

Production history
- Designed: 1936
- Variants: 1

Specifications

The SCR-245 Radio was a mobile MF/HF Signal Corps Radio used by the U.S. Army before and during World War II, for short range ground communications, It was one of the first crystal controlled sets used by the Army.

== Use ==
The SCR-245 was standardized on 10 June 1937, and used by Armored forces for command and control of tank units. It replaced the earlier SCR-189 and was used primarily in the early M2, M3 light tanks as well as the early M3 medium tanks. Their large size required them to be mounted in the tanks sponsons. It was replaced by the SCR-508 sets.

== Components ==
- BC-223 Transmitter
  - Modes: AM, CW.
  - Frequency range: 4 crystal-controlled channels, 2.0 MHz to 4.5 MHz.
  - RF Power output: 10 Watts.
  - Range: CW 45 Miles. Voice 20 Miles.
- BC-312 Receiver (See BC-342)
- PE-55 Dynamotor (12Volt input)
- MP14 or MP37 mast base and 15 foot whip antenna.

== Variants ==
- SCR-210 Receiver only set

== See also ==
- Signal Corps Radio
- Crystal oscillator

== General references ==
- TM 11-487 Electrical Communications Equipment
- TM 11-227 APRIL 1944 Radio Communication Equipment (Directory)
- TM 11-272
- Radio to free Europe
