= M1917 light tank =

M1917
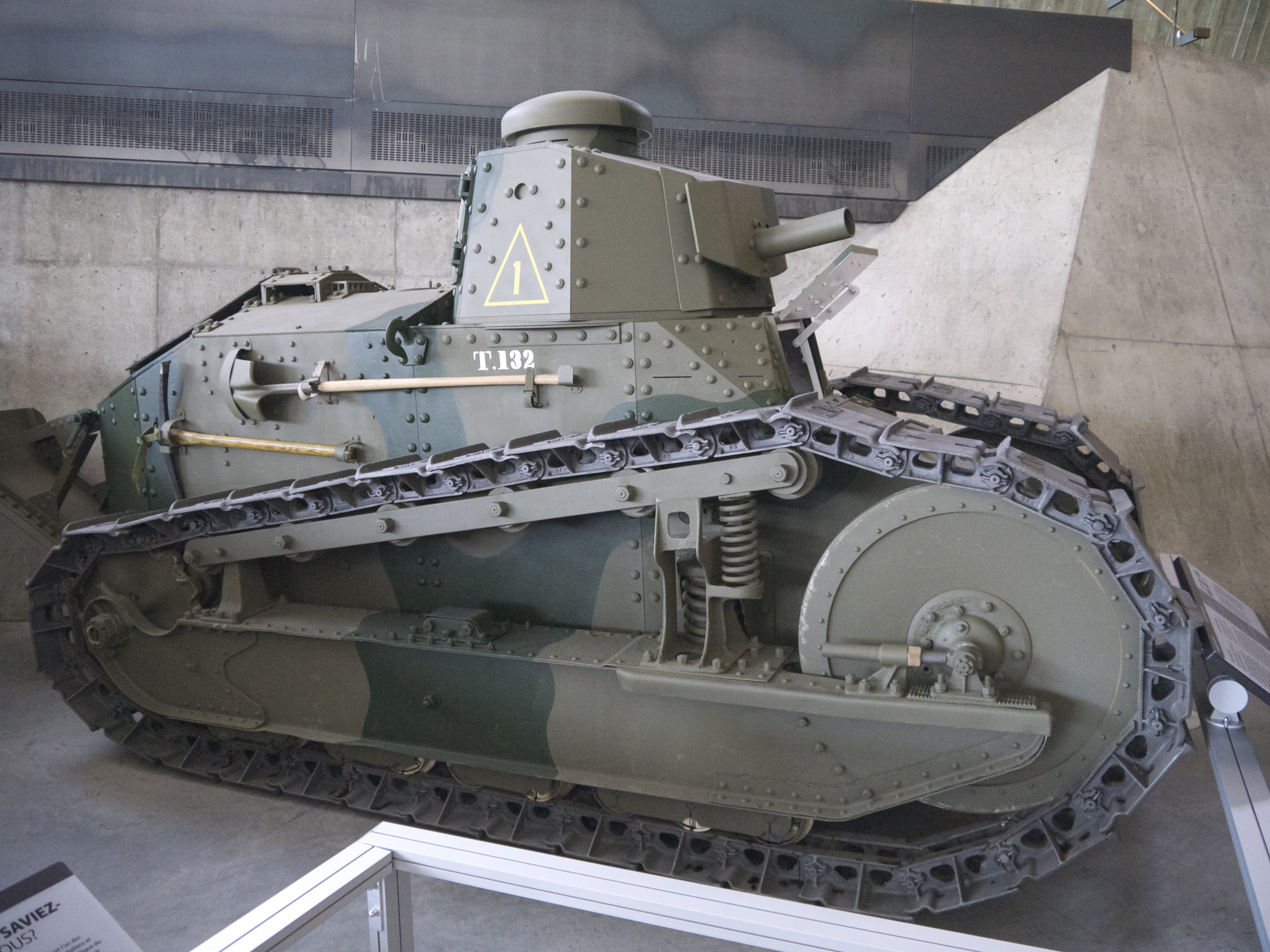
- M1917 tank at the Canadian War Museum
- Type: Light tank
- Place of origin: French Third Republic / United States

Production history
- No. built: 950

Specifications
- Mass: 7.25 tons
- Length: 16 ft 5 in (5,000 mm)
- Width: 5 ft 10.5 in (1,791 mm)
- Height: 7 ft 7 in (2,310 mm)
- Crew: 2
- Armor: 0.25" to 0.6" (6.35mm to 15.25mm)
- Main armament: 37mm M1916 gun or Marlin Rockwell M1917 machine gun, the latter then replaced by the M1919 Browning machine gun
- Engine: Buda HU modified 4-cylinder, with forced water cooling 42 hp (31 kW)
- Transmission: Sliding gear, 4 speed forward, 1 reverse
- Suspension: Coil and leaf springs, with bogies and rollers.
- Fuel capacity: 30 US gal (110 L) (30 miles on the road)
- Operational range: 48 km (30 miles) on road.
- Maximum speed: 8 km/h (5.5 mph)

The M1917 was the United States' first mass-produced tank, entering production shortly before the end of World War I. It was a license-built near-copy of the French Renault FT, and was intended to arm the American Expeditionary Forces in France, but American manufacturers failed to produce any in time to take part in the War. Of the 4,440 ordered, about 950 were eventually completed. They remained in service throughout the 1920s but did not take part in any combat, and were phased out during the 1930s.

== History ==
The United States entered World War I on the side of the Entente Powers in April, 1917, without any tanks of its own. The following month, in the light of a report into British and French tank theories and operations, the American Expeditionary Forces' commander-in-chief, Gen. John Pershing, decided that both light and heavy tanks were essential for the conduct of the war and should be acquired as soon as possible. A joint Anglo-American program was set up to develop a new type of heavy tank similar to those then in use by the British. It was, though, expected that sizeable quantities would not be available until April of the following year. Because of the wartime demands on French industry, the Inter-Allied Tank Commission decided that the quickest way to supply the American forces with sufficient armor was to manufacture the Renault FT light tank in the US.

A requirement of 1,200 was decided, later increased to 4,400, and some sample Renault tanks, plans, and various parts were sent to the US for study. The design was to be carried out by the Ordnance Department, under the job title "Six-ton Special Tractor," and orders for the vehicles placed with private manufacturers. However, the project was beset by problems: the French specifications were metric and incompatible with American (imperial) machinery; coordination between military departments, suppliers, and manufacturers was poor; bureaucratic inertia, lack of cooperation from military departments, and possible vested interests delayed progress.

The Army in France was expecting the first 100 M1917s by April 1918, and 600 per month thereafter. In the event, production did not begin until the autumn, and the first completed vehicles emerged only in October. Two tanks arrived in France on November 20, nine days after the end of hostilities, and a further eight in December. In the summer of 1918, with no sign of the M1917s and US troops desperately needed at the Front, France supplied 144 Renault FTs, which were used to equip the US Light Tank Brigade.

After the war, the Van Dorn Iron Works, the Maxwell Motor Co., and the C.L. Best Co. built 950 M1917s. 374 had cannons, 526 had machine guns, and 50 were signal (wireless) tanks. These were delivered to the Tank Corps, to complement about 200 Renault FTs brought back from France.

== Differences from the Renault FT ==
- Hotchkiss Mle 1914 machine gun replaced with a Marlin 1917 version of the M1895 Colt–Browning machine gun (later replaced with a M1919 Browning machine gun).
- Renault 4-cylinder engine replaced with a 42 hp Buda HU 4-cylinder engine.
- The exhaust is on the left-hand side instead of on the right.
- The FT mantlet for the machine-gun or 37mm cannon is replaced with a new design.
- Solid steel idler wheels replaced the steel-rimmed wooden or seven-spoked steel ones on the FT
- Additional vision slits are added to aid the driver.
- All M1917s have a polygonal turret; none used the circular turret type fitted to approximately 50% of Renault FTs.
- The frontal armor below the turret was also slightly modified.
- The 1917 used different track tensioning mechanisms.

== Operational use ==
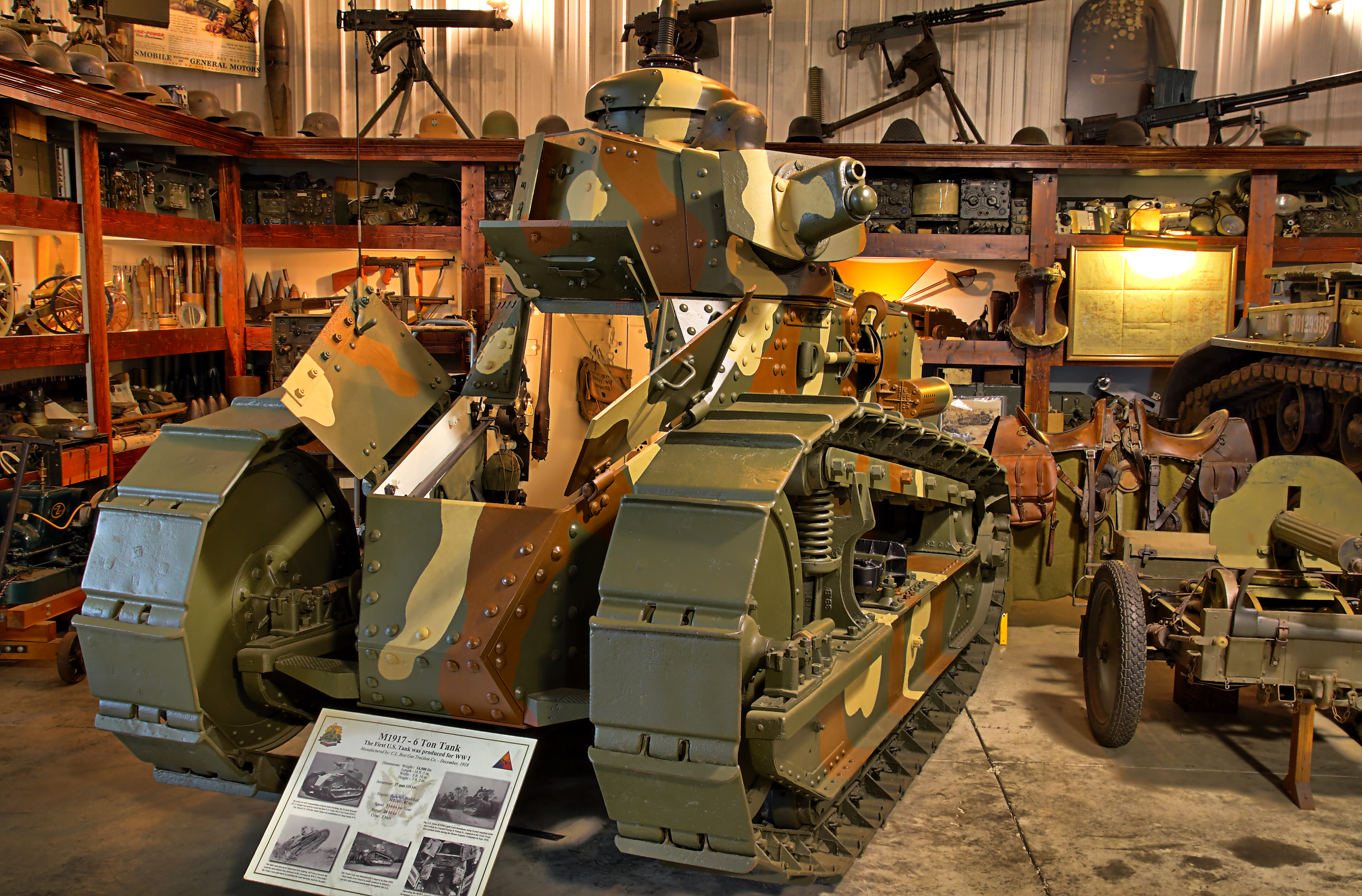
M1917 tank at the Ropkey Armor Museum

The M1917 did not take part in any combat, but was used domestically in various riots to quell mobs such as the Washington race riot of 1919 and the 1920 Lexington riot.

In June 1920 the Tank Corps was abolished as a separate branch, and control of tanks handed to the infantry. The number of tank units was progressively reduced, and the vehicles mothballed or scrapped.

Five accompanied the U.S. Marine Expeditionary Force (the China Marines) to Tianjin in April 1927 under General Smedley Butler, but there is no record of shots being fired. They returned to the US in late 1928.

In July 1932 six M1917s were deployed in Washington D.C. during the dispersal of the Bonus Army. George S. Patton Jr. states in his diaries that these vehicles were carried in trucks as a deterrent, but contemporary film shows them moving on their tracks along Pennsylvania Avenue. It is not believed that any shots were fired.

In 1940 the Canadian Army bought 250 surplus examples at $240 each as scrap, as it was illegal for the United States to sell the vehicles as actual tanks since it was, at this point, a neutral country. This allowed the Royal Canadian Armoured Corps to gain valuable experience and training before heading to Europe where they trained with more modern equipment. The Canadian Army accepted 236 pieces, fifteen of which were sent to Camp Borden for training use, while others were used for training at other locations, such as Fort Garry Horse.

== Variants ==
Command & Signals: Similar to the Télégraphie Sans Fil (TSF) FT-17, these were unarmed, featured a larger, non-rotating turret, and fitted with a radio and table for maps. 50 built.

M1917 A1: In 1919 the chassis of the 1917 was lengthened 1 foot to accommodate a more powerful, 100 hp Franklin engine, which increased the maximum road speed to 9 mph. A M1919 Browning .30 cal machine gun took the place of the M1917 Marlin. Road wheels were made of steel. Approximately 526 built.

Gun Tank: Around 374 1917s were made into gun tanks by the removal of the machine gun and addition of a French Canon d'Infanterie de 37 modèle 1916 TRP. 238 rounds were carried in total, with 100 round racks attached to the hull on each side of the commander's position, plus 25 round and 13 round ready racks were installed within the turret itself.

== Surviving examples ==
Approximately 20 M1917s survive.

== Depiction in films ==
M1917s were used by U.S. film-makers on numerous occasions as a substitute for Renault FTs, to depict either American tank actions during World War I or Renaults in use by European armies during and after the War.

A M1917, stolen from the Army, is used to rob banks in the rural American west, in an episode of the 1971 television series Bearcats!.

== See also ==
- List of U.S. military vehicles by supply catalog designation SNL G-12
- SCR-189
- Tanks of the United States
