= SCR-508 =

WW2-era US Army radio

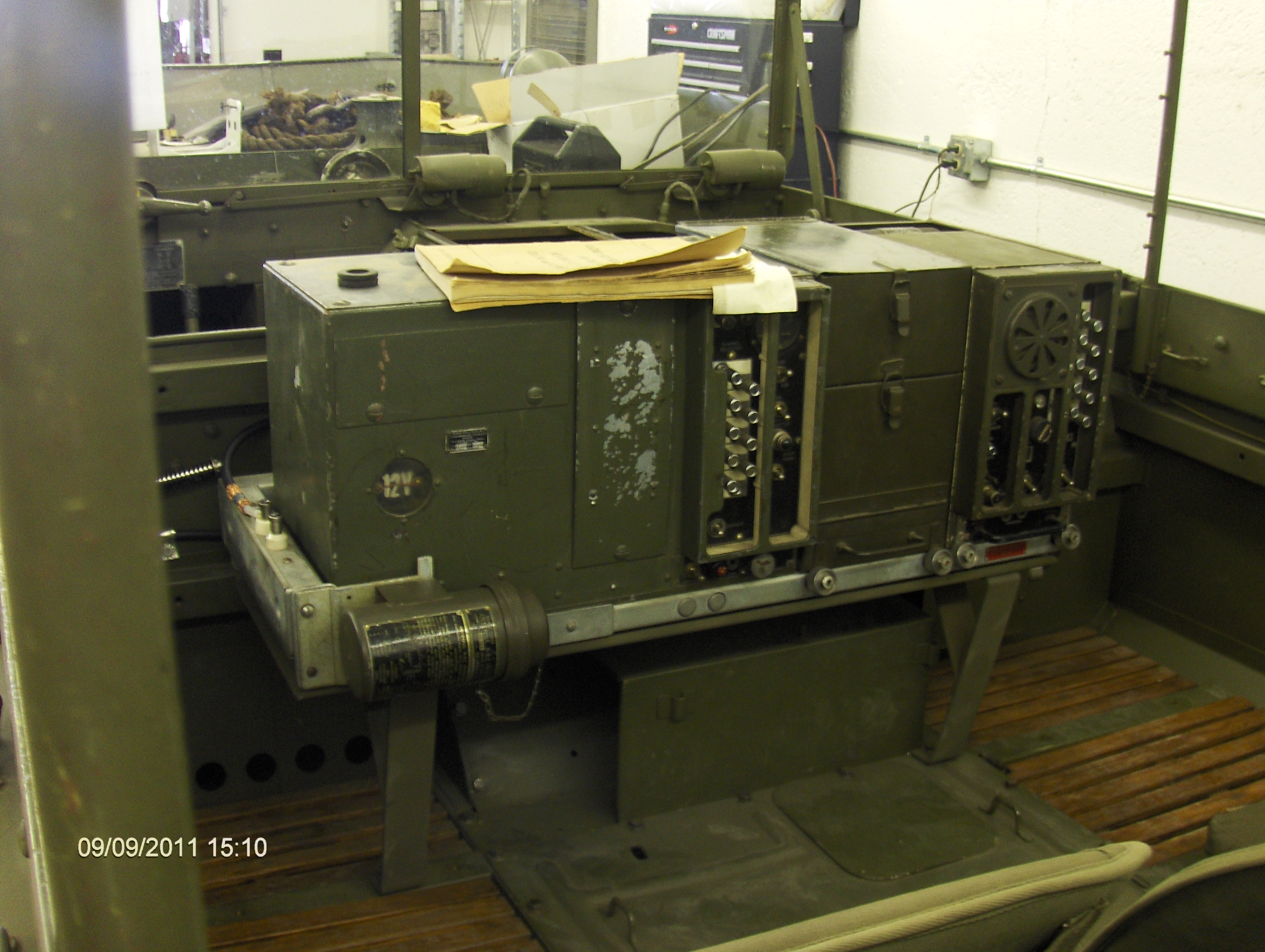
- SCR-508 in M29 Weasel
- Type: Vehicle Radio
- Place of origin: United States

Service history
- In service: 1941-1958
- Used by: US Army
- Wars: World War II, Korean War

Production history
- Designed: 1940
- Produced: July 1941
- Variants: 2

Specifications

The SCR-508 radio was a mobile Signal Corps Radio used by the U.S. Army during World War II, for short range ground communications. The SCR-508 series radio represented the Army's commitment to both FM and crystal tuning, and was used extensively by armor and mechanized units. The turret bustle of late series light and medium tanks was designed around this radio.

== Use ==
The SCR-508 series was standardized on 22 July 1941, and used by armored forces for command and control of tank units. It replaced the earlier SCR-293 and SCR-245 and was used primarily in the M5 Stuart light tanks as well as the M4 Sherman medium tanks. It also provided the intercom system to all crew stations. It provided voice communications between tanks and other vehicles/units equipped with FM radios (such as the SCR-510 and others) operating in the same frequency range. One of 10 channels could be selected by the operator, a total of 80 channels were available for use at 100 kHz channel spacing. Channels were referred to by a numerical identifier. For example, 27.1 MHz was "channel 271", 25.0 MHz was "channel 250" and so on. It was replaced by the AN/VRC-8 series radios.

== Components ==
- BC-604 transmitter (FM, CW/voice), 10 crystal controlled channels covering 20.0 to 27.9 MHz (14.99 to 10.75 m), 25 watts, range 7 mi (11 km)
  - DM-35 dynamotor (12 Volt input) or
  - DM-37 dynamotor (24 Volt)
- BC-603 receiver (2 for 508 set)
  - DM-34 dynamotor (12 volt input) or
  - DM-36 dynamotor (24 volt)
- FT-237 mount or rack
- CH-74 cabinet for use in open command vehicles (FT-284 Legs)
- MP-52 mast base for CH-74
- MP-48 antenna base, and 9 ft (2.7 m) whip antenna
- CH-264 chest for parts and accessories (could be slid into mount in place of receiver)
- T-17 microphone
- HS-30 headset
- RM-29 telephone patch set
- BC-606 intercom box, at crew stations
- I-208 signal generator (TM 11-317)

== Variants ==
Different combinations of components could be arranged in the mounts.

- SCR-528 transmitter and single receiver
- SCR-538 Receiver and BC-605 Amplifier (for intercom)
- AN/VRC-5 Separately mounted transmitter and receiver
  - FT-508 mount (transmitter)
  - FT-345 mount (receiver)

The Artillery branch used the same radios mirroring the SCR-508 series but with a different frequency range

- SCR-608
  - BC-684 transmitter 27.0 to 38.9 MHz (11.10 to 7.71 m) at 35 watts, for 15 mi (24 km)
  - BC-683 receiver
- SCR-628

== See also ==
- Joint Electronics Type Designation System – Unclassified designation system for United States military electronic equipment
- List of military electronics of the United States
- Signal Corps Radio
- Crystal oscillator
- Wireless Set No. 19
- Similar rank (panzer) radios used by Germany in WWII

== General references ==
- TM 11-487 Electrical Communications Equipment
- TM 11-600 SCR-508 Operator
- TM 11-620 SCR-608 operators
- Radio to free Europe
