= Wireless Communications of the German Army in World War II =

How the Wehrmacht communicated wirelessly

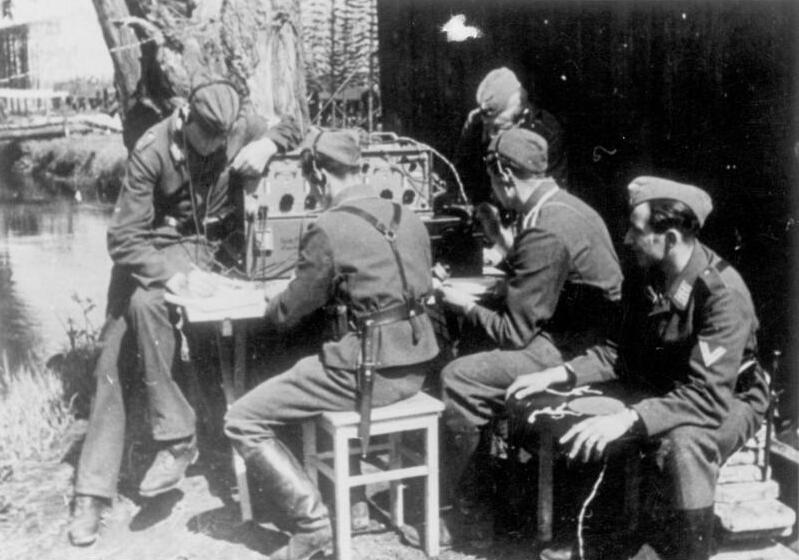
Aeronautical ground radio station

During World War II, the German Army relied on a diverse array of communications to maintain contact with its mobile forces and in particular with its armoured forces. Most of this equipment received the generic prefix FuG for Funkgerät, meaning "radio device". Occasionally the shorted Fu designation were used and there were exceptions to both these systems. Number ranges were not unique across the services so sometimes different equipment used by different services had the same FuG prefix. This article is a list and a description of the radio equipment.

== Armoured force communications ==
Fug 1: Also known as Torn.E.b And Pack Receiver b. A Medium-wave receiver it operated in the 0,1 to 7,095 kHz frequency range. Repackaged for use in several other receivers and transceivers.

FuG 2: A high-band HF/low-band VHF receiver. Also known a USW receiver c1. It operated in the 27,000 to 33,300 kHz (27 MHz - 33.3 MHz) range (same frequency range used by modern 27MHz CB radio systems) The FuG 2 was never used on its own but as an additional receiver in command tanks and relay devices. It was usually installed in section leader and company commanders' vehicles, to allow them to listen on one frequency while transmitting and receiving on another. As it operated on the same band as the FuG 5 it allowed them, for example, to listen to the regimental command net while talking to the subordinate units at the same time. Matching the transmitters that operated in this frequency range, this receiver provided for 50 kHz channel steps in the 27.000 MHz to 33.300 MHz range for a total of 125 available channels.

FuG 3: A low-band VHF receiver. It operated in the 42–47.8 MHz range. Repackaged as FuG 3 neu for use with motorcycle troops.

FuG 4: A medium-wave receiver used in command tanks. It operated in the 1,130 to 3,000 kHz frequency range. It was used with the same antenna as the Fug 8. It was usually used for communication with a Fug 8 in the same installation. (Fug 8 + Fug 4)

FuG 5: A high-band HF/low-band VHF transceiver. It operated in the 27,000 to 33,300 kHz (27-33.3 MHz) frequency range with a transmission power of 10 Watts. This equipment provided for 125 radio channels at 50 kHz channel spacing. It was usually used with a two-metre antenna. Was present in almost all German tanks and some other vehicles. Was the standard kit for tank-to-tank communication within platoons and companies. Range was approx 2–3 km when using AM voice and 3–4 km when using CW Reworked to produce the FuG 5 (Luft) variant which was used for air-to-ground communication until replaced with the FuG 7.

FuG 6: A high-band HF/low-band VHF transceiver. It operated in the 27,000 to 33,300 kHz (27-33.3 MHz) frequency range with a transmission power of 20 Watts. It was usually used with a two-metre antenna. It was used by armoured observation posts. These were usually early-model tanks with some of their armament removed and replaced by equipment for artillery observers. It was used by the observers to communicate with the armoured unit leaders via their Fug 5 radios. Main advantage over the FuG 5 was greater range. Range was approx 4–6 km when using AM voice and 6–8 km when using CW. Comparable to the American SCR-508 tank radio, which covered a similar frequency range (20-27.9 MHz) at 25 watts and the SCR-608 artillery variant (which operated in the 27-38.9 MHz frequency band) The major difference between German Army tank sets and US Army tank and artillery sets was the American use of FM for the high-HF/low-VHF bands.

FuG 7: A VHF transceiver (receiver/transmitter) used in command tanks. It operated in the 42,000 to 48,300 kHz (42-48.3 MHz) frequency range with a transmission power of 20 Watts. It was usually used with a 1.4 metre antenna. It was matched with the Luftwaffe transceiver Fug 17 in ground support operations. It was used for CAS operations, though these became rare after late 1944 with the result that many command tanks with this equipment fitted were converted to other roles. Ground-to-air range 60 km AM voice to 80 km CW.

FuG 8: A medium-wave transceiver (receiver/transmitter) used in command tanks. It operated in the 1,130 to 3,000 kHz frequency range with a transmission power of 30 Watts. It was used with various antenna ranging from 1.8 to 9-metre antenna. It was used for communication back to the regimental command post. Range 25 km AM voice to 140 km CW using the nine-metre antenna, the station had to be stopped to use this antenna.

FuG 9: A transceiver, operated in the 0.1 - 7.1 MHz (100 kHz - 7100 kHz) range.

FuG 10: A medium-wave transceiver (receiver/transmitter) used in command tanks. It operated in the 1,130 to 3,000 kHz frequency range with a transmission power of 30 Watts. It was used with a frame antenna on various reconnaissance units. Range 10 km AM voice to 40 km CW.

FuG 11: A medium-wave transceiver (receiver/transmitter) used in command tanks. It operated in the 1,130 to 3,000 kHz frequency range with a transmission power of 100 Watts. Used at the regimental command post. Range 70 km AM voice to 200 km CW.

FuG 12: A medium-wave transceiver (receiver/transmitter) used in command tanks. It operated in the 1,130 to 3,000 kHz frequency range with a transmission power of 80 Watts. It was used with a two-metre antenna. Reconnaissance units later in the war.

FuG 13: A Fug 6 with two receivers rather than one.

FuG 14: Multi-radio setup consisting of several separate radios.

FuG 15: A HF receiver. It operated in the 23,000 to 24,950 kHz (23-24.95 MHz) frequency range. It was matched with transceiver Fug 16 for use with Sturmartillerie (self-propelled artillery).

FuG 16: A HF transceiver (receiver/transmitter) used in the command vehicles of Sturmartillerie units. It operated in the 23,000 to 24,950 kHz (23-24.95 MHz) frequency range with a transmission power of 10 Watts. It was usually used with a two-metre antenna. Range 2 km AM voice to 4 km CW.

FuG 17: Designation for a Torn Fu H transceiver.

Fug 18: Group of high HF band - low VHF / mid band VHF radios covering 25 MHz - 77.1 MHz

Fug 19: A HF transceiver operating in the range 3 - 7.5 MHz. In some command units.

Fug 20: A 0.1 - 7.1 MHz receiver paired with a 1.1 - 3 MHz transmitter.

Fug 21: A 0.1 - 10 MHz receiver paired with a 2.5 - 7.5 MHz transmitter.

Fug 24: A 0.1 - 7.1 MHz receiver paired with a 3 - 7.5 MHz transmitter.

Fug 25: A 2.5 - 27.5 MHz receiver paired with a 3 - 16.6 MHz transmitter.

FuSpr.a: A high-band HF transceiver. It operated in the 24.1 to 25 MHz (24100 to 25000 kHz) frequency range with a transmission power of 5 Watts. It was used with antenna of either 1.4 to 2.0 metres antenna. It was used for by reconnaissance elements for intercommunication. Range 5 km AM voice.

FuSpr.d: A mid-band HF/high band HF transceiver. It operated in the 23.11 to 24.01 MHz (24100 to 25000 kHz) frequency range with a transmission power of 5 Watts. It was used with antenna of either 1.4 to 2.0 metres antenna. Used by anti-tank units.

FuSpr.f: A mid-band HF transceiver. It operated in the 19,990 to 21,470 kHz (19.99-21.47 MHz) frequency range with a transmission power of 5 Watts. It was used with antenna of either 1.4 to 2.0 metres antenna. It was used for by observation teams of the Sturmartillerie to communicate with artillery units. Range 5 km AM voice.

== Infantry Equipment ==
The German-army-issued infantry radios in two main series. The "Backpack" or Torn (Tornister) series and the field or Feld series.

=== Torn.Fu Series ===
Torn.Fu.a: A HF transceiver. It operated in the 3–6.67 MHz frequency range. 2 Watt output AM voice and CW

Torn.Fu.b: A HF transceiver. It operated in the 3-5 MHz frequency range. 0.7 Watt output AM voice and CW. Formed the base design of other units. Used by the infantry at the regimental and battalion level. Not intended to be used on the move.

Torn.Fu.c: A HF transceiver. It operated in the 1.5-2.6 MHz frequency range. Otherwise identical to Torn.Fu.b. Used by artillery observers.

Torn.Fu.d2: A VHF low band transceiver. It operated in the 33.8-38 MHz frequency range. 1.5 Watt output AM voice and CW. Range approximately 10 km with Cw and 3 km with voice. Used by the infantry. A common infantry set used for voice radio nets. Could be used on the move with one man carrying the transmitter/receiver and the other the battery/power supply and handset. A cable linked the two men together. Comparable in range, performance and frequency band used to the VHF FM SCR-300 (BC-1000) infantry backpack radio set (40 MHz - 48 MHz, FM voice) used by US and Allied forces.

Torn.Fu.f: A HF transceiver. It operated in the 4.5-6.67 MHz frequency range. 0.7 Watt output AM voice and CW. Panzergrenadier units. Identical to Torn.Fu.b with exception of frequency range.

Torn.Fu.g: A HF transceiver. It operated in the 2.5-3.5 MHz frequency range. 0.5 Watt output AM voice and CW. Used at the battalion to company level of the Panzergrenadier. Some command and reconnaissance units had this infantry transceiver to allow then to talk to Panzergrenadier units.

Torn.Fu.h: A HF transceiver. It operated in the 23-28 MHz frequency range. 0.6 Watt output AM voice. Sturmartillerie units.

Torn.Fu.i: A HF transceiver. It operated in the 1.87 - 3 MHz frequency range. Replacement for Torn.Fu.f.

Torn.Fu.k: A HF transceiver. It operated in the 4.5-6.67 MHz frequency range. 1 Watt output AM voice and CW. Replacement for Torn.Fu.g.

=== Feld.Fu Series ===
Feldfu.a1: 120-156 MHz infantry, a VHF transceiver. 0.15 Watt (150 mW) output AM voice and CW. Range 1.5 km.

Feldfu b: 90-110 MHz Used by the infantry used in two versions. 0.15 Watt (150mW) output AM voice and CW. The b version was used by the infantry until they changed to the 'c' model radio in another band. This unit was also used by motorcycle troops in the first half of the war. Thereafter version b1 was used by the Pioneers. Later a simplified version (b2), of lower power (.12w), was used by the Panzergrenadiers.

Feldfu b1: Pioniere VHF radio 90 MHz - 110 MHz range 1.5 km.

Feldfu b2: Panzergrenadier only two tubes, no AF tube Rv2,4P700

Feldfu c: 130 MHz - 160 MHz infantry. 0.15 Watt output AM voice and CW. Infantry. Range 1.5 km.

Feldfu d: VHF low band 32 MHz - 38 MHz Artillery Observers. 0.15 Watt output AM voice and CW. Infantry. Range 1.5 km.

Feldfu f: 28 MHz - 33.0 MHz Panzergrenadier. Could interwork with the Fug 5 of the armour.

Feldfu h: 23.1 - 28.0 MHz Assault Guns and Sturmartillerie

=== Other ===
KL.Fuspr.d: A VHF transceiver. It operated in the 32-38 MHz frequency range. Single-unit "walkie-talkie" system. Used by artillery forward observers.

== UHF Communication Link Equipment ==
From 1936 the German forces started deploying a range of communication links using UHF frequencies to form a point-to-point mesh communication network. During the war this was extended to cover the majority of the occupied areas or Europe and North Africa. Both the army and the air force made use of the same equipment. The units of the T series were "backpack"-style mobile equipment. The K series were truck mobile units using a range of masts up to approximately 11 m tall. The G series were still mobile but were intended to form more of a backbone for communications and were intended to remain in place for longer periods than the K. They again used a series of masts up to 50 m high. Depending on the set a range of communication facilities were available consisting of voice and/or teletype and Hellscriber. Range was line-or-sight so the ranges reported here were assuming the antenna could "see" one another.

DMG 2 T: Pack unit, operating on the 475 - 525 MHz band, single channel voice or 800 character-per-second teletype. Range up to 50 km. Tripod mast or 11 m mast. Transmission power 0.15 watt. Power battery.

DMG 3 K: Truck-mounted. Operating on the 475 - 525 MHz band, two channels. Channel 1, one voice channel or one 800 CPS teletype. Channel 2 6000 CPS teletype. Range up to 50 km. Mast or tower. Power 220 V AC 50 Hz.

Michael 2 B - DMG 4a K: Truck-mounted. Operating on the 500 - 560 MHz band, two channels. Channel 1, voice or 2400 CPS teletype. Channel 2 8000 CPS teletype. Range up to 100 km. Tower up to 50 m. Transmission power 0.4 Watts. Power 220 V AC 50 Hz 250 VA.

Michael 2 R - DMG 5 K: Truck-mounted. Operating on the 502 - 555 MHz band, two channels. Channel 1 Voice or 5500 CPS teletype or three channels teletype. Channel 2 8000 CPS teletype. Transmitter power 1 watt. Range up to 50 km. Mast or tower. Power 22 V AC 50 Hz 300 VA.

Rudolf - DMG 3 G: 'Heavy' link. Operating on the 600 - 650 MHz band, two channels. Channel 1 control channel voice, Channel 2 nine voice channels or p x 3 Teletype. Range up to 100 km. Tower up to 50 m. Transmission power 3.5 watts. Power 220 V AC 50 Hz 680 VA.

Stuttgart - FuG D 3: Development item, possible none deployed. Operating on the 1250 - 1390 MHz band, two channels. Range up to 100 km. Tower up to 50 m.

DM 43: Development item, possible none deployed. Operating on the 2000 - 2100 MHz band. No other details available

== Bibliography ==
- Rottman, Gordon. WW2 Battlefield Communications. Osprey Publishing Ltd 2010. ISBN 978-184603-847-1
- Niccoli, Riccardo. Befehlspanzer. RN Publishing 2014. ISBN 978-88-95011-08-0
- Hart, Stephen. Panther Medium Tank. Osprey Publishing Ltd 2003. ISBN 978-1-84176-543-3
- Chamberlain, Peter. Encyclopedia German Tanks of World War Two. Arms & Armour 1999. ISBN 1-85409-518-8
- Metsu, Pierre. German Radio Sets. Heimdal 2004. ISBN 2-84048-181-2
