= M1 combat car =

Light Tank, M1
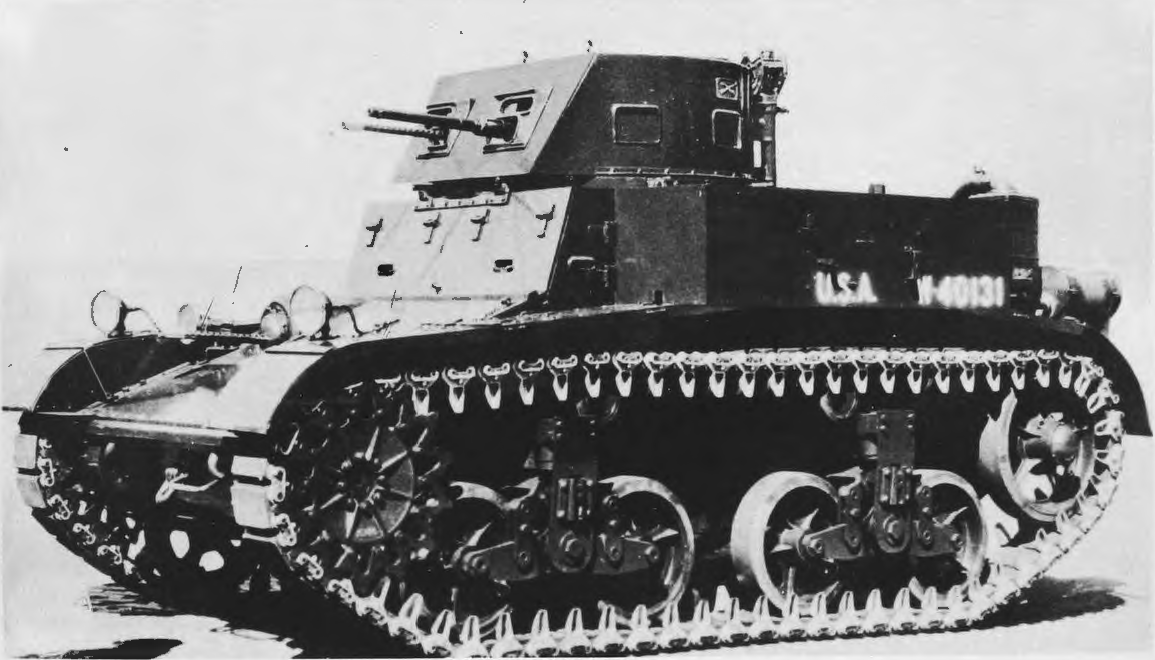
- M1 Combat Car
- Type: Light tank
- Place of origin: United States

Service history
- In service: 1937–1943
- Used by: United States
- Wars: Philippines campaign (1941–1942)

Production history
- Manufacturer: Rock Island Arsenal
- Produced: 1935–?
- No. built: 113

Specifications (M1)
- Mass: ~10 short tons (9.1 t)
- Length: 4.14 m (13 ft 7 in)
- Width: 2.4 m (7 ft 10 in)
- Height: 2.26 m (7 ft 5 in)
- Crew: 4
- Armor: 6–16 mm
- Main armament: .50 cal (12.7 mm) machine gun.30 cal (7.62 mm) machine gun
- Secondary armament: .30 cal (7.62 mm) machine gun
- Engine: Continental R-670 7-cylinder air-cooled radial gasoline 250 hp (190 kW)
- Suspension: Vertical volute spring
- Operational range: 161 km (100 mi) on roads
- Maximum speed: 72 km/h (45 mph) on roads

The M1 combat car, officially Light Tank, M1, was a light tank used by the United States Cavalry in the late 1930s and developed at the same time as the U.S. Army Infantry Branch's very similar Light Tank, M2.

After the Spanish Civil War, most armies (including the U.S. Army), realized that they needed tanks armed with cannons, not vehicles armed with machine guns, and so the M1 became obsolete.

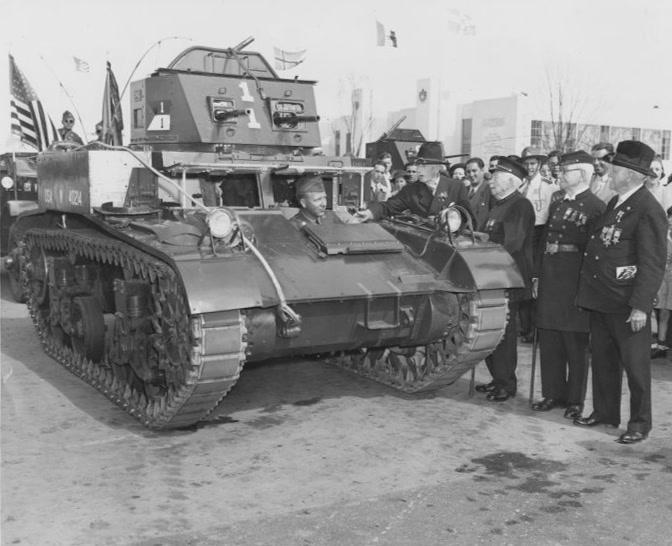
Civil War veterans (wearing Grand Army of the Republic uniforms) inspect an M1 combat car at the 1939 World's Fair in New York

== History and development ==
The National Defense Act of 1920 set tanks as the responsibility of the infantry and the general staff defined the purpose of tanks as the support of infantry units. Light tanks were defined as weighing five tons or less – so they could be carried by trucks – and medium tanks no greater than 15 tons to meet bridge weight limits. With very tight restrictions on spending, tank development in the U.S. was limited to a couple of test vehicles a year. The mechanization of the army was promoted by General Douglas MacArthur (at the time the Chief of Staff of the US Army) who believed that the cavalry should have tanks for an exploiting role rather than acting in support of the infantry. To allow U.S. Army cavalry units to be equipped with armored fighting vehicles, the tanks developed for the cavalry were designated "combat cars". (Note: The same loophole was used for Japan's Type 92 heavy armoured car, a light tank for the cavalry.)

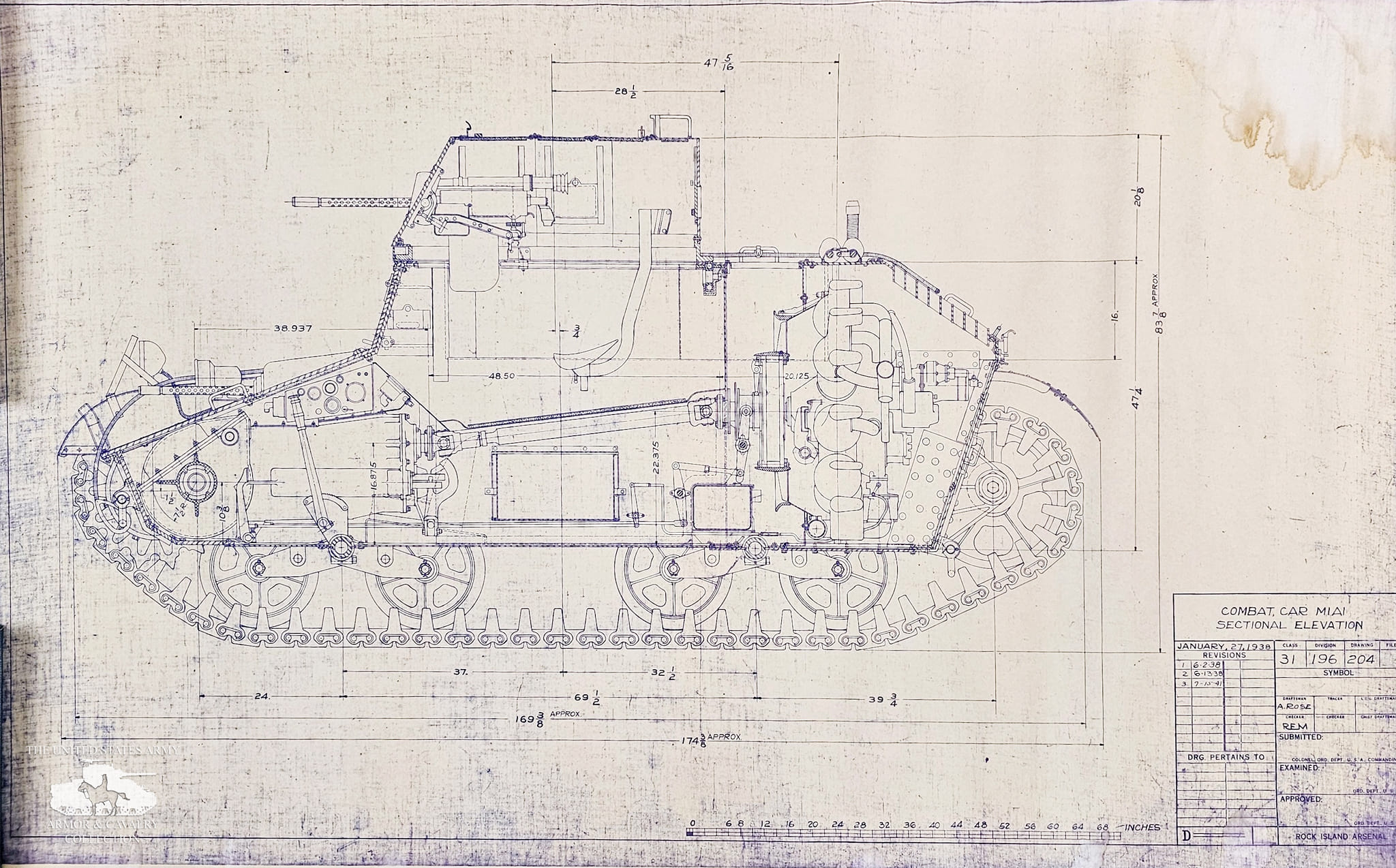
Engineering blueprints for the M1A1

In the mid-1930s, the Rock Island Arsenal built three experimental T2 light tanks inspired by the British Vickers 6-ton tank. At the same time, they built a light tank similar to the T2 for the cavalry – the T5 combat car. The only major difference between the two was that the T5 used vertical volute suspension while the T2 had leaf springs as on the Vickers. The T5 was developed further and the T5E2 was accepted for production as the "M1 Combat Car".

The M1 entered service in 1937. A change to the suspension so that the idler wheel rested on the ground ("trailing") increased the length of track in contact with the ground and improved the ride. Together with a different engine and improved turret, this produced the M2 combat car. In 1940, the distinction between infantry and cavalry tank units disappeared with the establishment of the Armored Force to manage all tanks in the U.S. Army. The "combat car" name was superfluous, and the cavalry unit tanks redesignated the M1 combat car as the "light tank M1A1" and the M2 combat car as the "light tank M1A2".

== Service ==
The M1 was fielded by the Philippines military early on in WWII during the Philippines campaigns of 1941-1942 when armored vehicles of all manner were needed. All M1s that served that were not destroyed by enemy action or by their own crews, subsequently fell to enemy Japanese forces.

The M1 and M2 combat cars were not used in combat by the U.S. Army after this during World War II; though some were used for training purposes.

== Variants ==
- M1 – The original variant. Eighty-nine built.
- M1E2 – The prototype for the M1A1
- M1A1 – A new octagonal turret instead of a D-shaped one; increased distance between the wheel bogies; constant mesh gears; 17 were built in 1938.
- M1A1E1 – Prototype of the M2 combat car. The engine was replaced by a Guiberson T-1020 diesel.
- M2 – New Guiberson diesel engine and trailing idler. Thirty-four built.

== See also ==
- SCR-189
- List of U.S. military vehicles by supply catalog designation
- List of U.S. military vehicles by model number
- M2 light tank
- T7 Combat Car
