= Light tank =

Class of tank

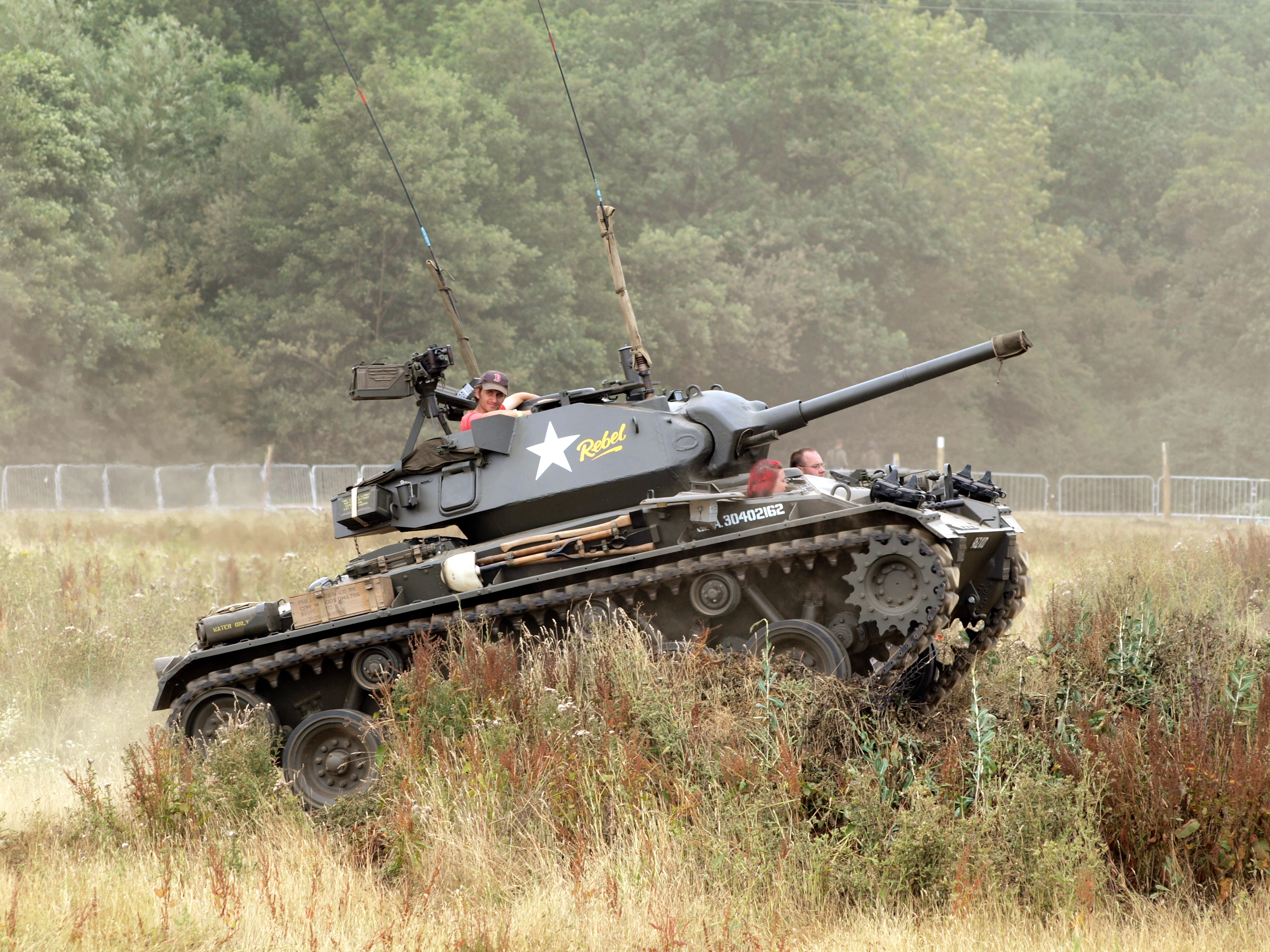
The M24 Chaffee, an American light tank used during the later part of World War II, and several subsequent conflicts

A light tank is a tank variant initially designed for rapid movements in and out of combat, and to outmaneuver heavier tanks. It is a smaller classification with thinner armor and a less powerful main gun, tailored for better tactical mobility and ease of transport and logistics. They are primarily employed in screening, armored reconnaissance, skirmishing, artillery observation, and supplementing landing operations in a fire support role of expeditionary forces, where larger heavier tanks are unavailable or have difficulties operating safely or efficiently.

The fast light tank was a major feature of the pre–World War II army buildup, where it was expected they would be used to exploit breakthroughs in enemy lines created by slower, heavier tanks, with the goal of disrupting communications and supply lines. Numerous small tank designs and "tankettes" were developed during this period and known under a variety of names, including the "combat car".

Early light tank designs were generally better armed and armored than armored cars, but used tracks in order to provide better cross-country mobility. The light tank has been one of the few tank variants to survive the development of the main battle tank—in which technological advancements have rendered all previous weight variants obsolete—and has seen use in a variety of roles including the support of light airborne or amphibious forces and reconnaissance. Modified IFVs are assuming these roles in many militaries due to their immediate availability, and as a cheaper versatile alternative to developing and fielding a pure light tank.

== History ==
=== 20th century ===
==== World War I ====
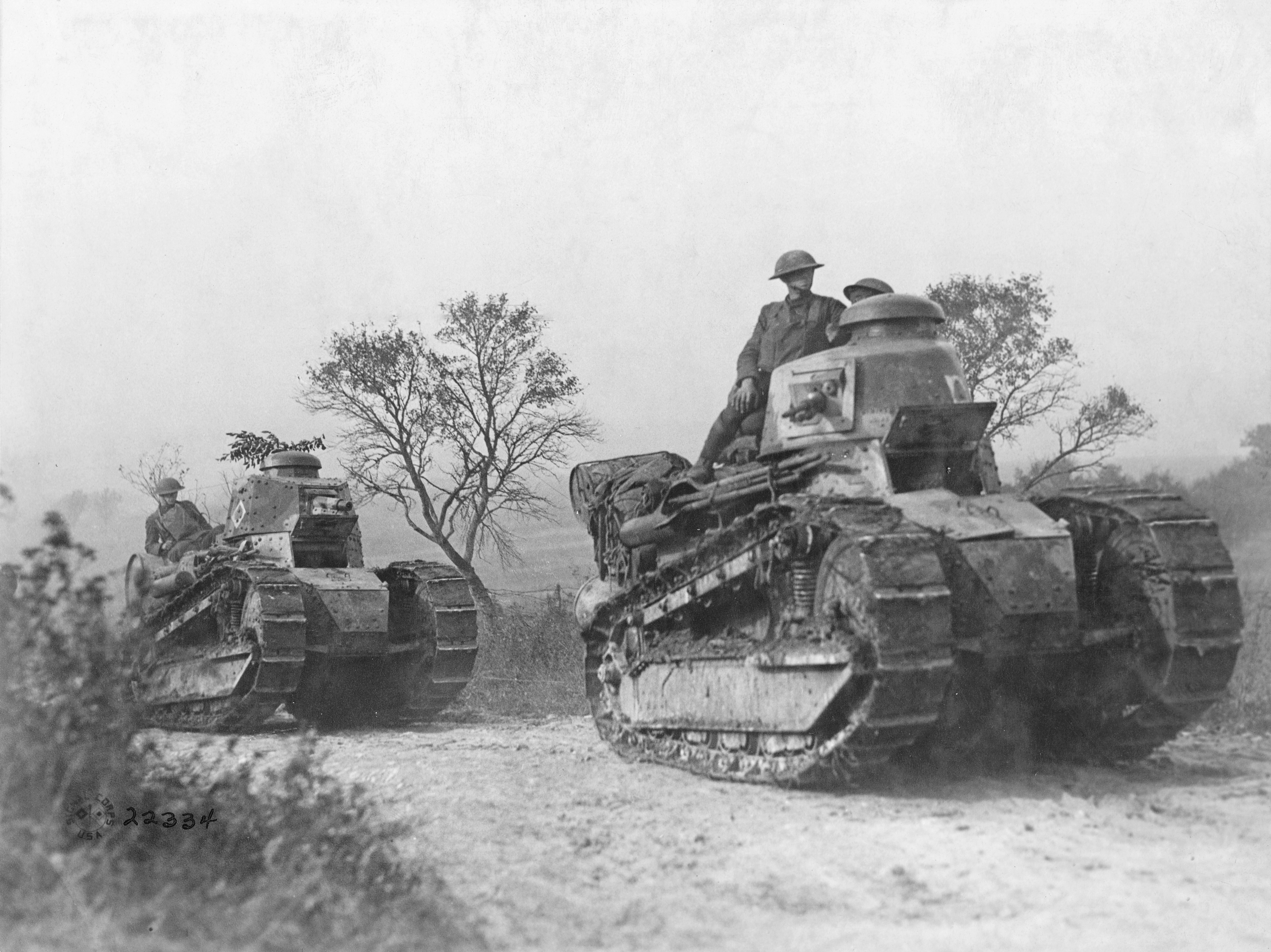
US Army operating Renault FT tanks

In World War I, industrial initiative also led to swift advances. The car industry, already used to vehicle mass production and having much more experience in vehicle layout, designed the first practical light tanks in 1916, a class largely neglected by the British. Renault's small tank design, the FT, was the first tank to incorporate a top-mounted turret with a full rotation. The FT was in many respects the first truly modern tank having a layout that has been followed by almost all designs ever since: driver at the front; main armament in a fully rotating turret on top; engine at the rear. Previous models had been "box tanks", with a single crowded space combining the role of engine room, fighting compartment, ammunition stock and driver's cabin. The FT had the largest production run of any tank of the war, over 3,700 (mostly in 1918), and was more numerous than all British and German tanks combined. (Note: By comparison the French built about 800 medium and heavy tanks in total. The British built about 2,500 heavy tanks and 100 medium tanks during the war.)

==== Interwar ====
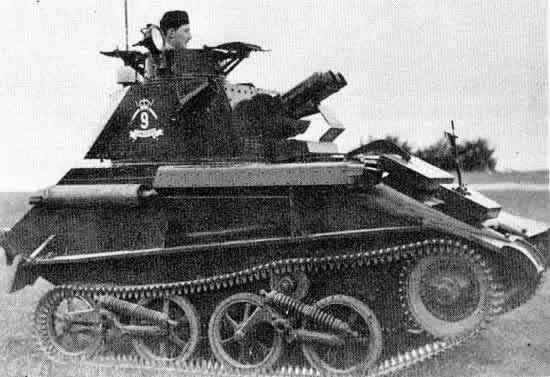
British light tank Mk V

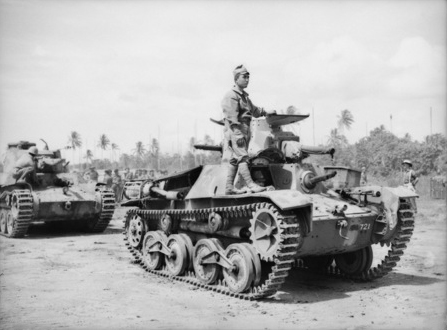
Type 95 Ha-Go tanks in New Britain following the Japanese surrender

The Carden Loyd tankette and its derivatives were adopted by several nations as small tracked vehicles carrying a machine gun for armament. At a time of limited military budgets, tankettes were relatively cheap and functioned as reconnaissance vehicles and mobile machine gun posts. In 1928, the British firm of Vickers-Armstrong started promoting another design by John Carden and Vivien Loyd as the "six-ton tank". Although rejected by the British Army, it was bought by a large number of nations in small numbers. It formed the basis of the Soviet T-26 (around 10,000 built) and the Polish 7TP tank and influenced the Italian Fiat M11/39. The British Army did not use the design as a light tank themselves but a developed version of the Carden Loyd tankette as the starting point for a series of British light tanks intended for use in imperial policing and expeditionary warfare. As the only tank fit for immediate manufacture, it was a key element in the expansion of the British Army in the period leading up to the outbreak of war.

In general, French tanks of the 1930s were well-armored, innovative vehicles that owed little to foreign designs. However, the light tanks lacked firepower and almost all French tanks were handicapped by their one-man turrets, even the larger tanks such as the Char B1, which overworked the commander who, besides directing the vehicle, or even a troop, had to load and aim the turret gun. The lack of radios with the light tanks was not seen as a major drawback, since French doctrine called for slow-paced, deliberate maneuvers in close conformance to plans. The role of small unit leaders was to execute plans, not to take the initiative in combat. In 1939, a belated effort was made to improve flexibility and increase the number of radios.

Throughout the interwar period the US produced only a few hundred tanks. From the end of World War I to 1935, only 15 tanks were produced. Most were derivatives or foreign designs or very poor quality private designs. The Christie designs were among the few better examples, but the US Army acquired only three Christies and did not pursue the idea any further. Budget limitations and the low priority given to the army meant that there were few resources for building tanks. The US Army instead developed and tested tank components such as suspensions, tracks, and transmissions. This paid off when production had to be initiated on the outbreak of war.

==== World War II ====
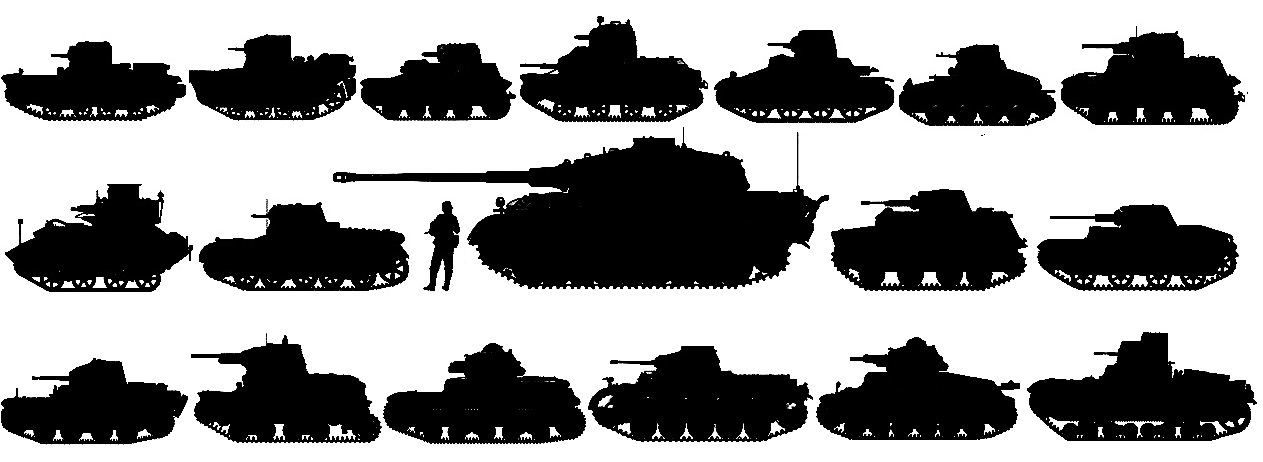
Light tanks of early World War II (Tiger II placed in the middle for comparison)

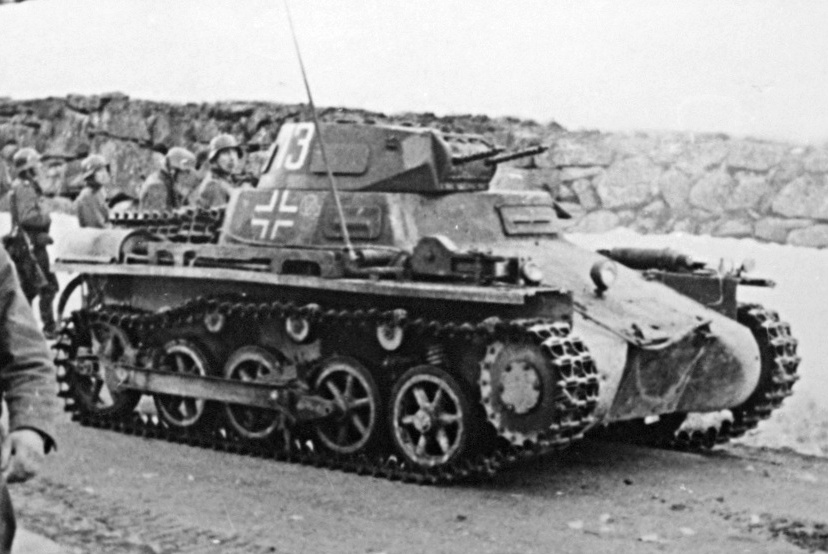
German Panzer I in combat during the German invasion of Norway

At the start of World War II, the majority of all of the great powers' tank forces consisted of light designs. The most common were the British Light Tank Mk VI, French Renault R35, German Panzer I, Italian L3/35 (classified as a light tank by the Royal Italian Army, a tankette by others), Japanese Type 95 Ha-Go light tank, Soviet T-26, and American M2 light tank.

===== Soviet =====
The Soviet BT tanks were the most advanced in the 1930s, extremely fast and mounting high velocity 45 mm cannons. Their only drawback were their petrol engines which caught fire often and easily during the Nomonhan fighting, which lasted from about May through September 1939. The Japanese Type 95 Ha-Go light tank was equipped with a diesel engine, and although mounting a 37 mm cannon, it was a low velocity gun with a maximum effective range of about 700 meters. However, this conflict would be instrumental in developing the famous T-34 medium tank.

===== Germany =====
Germany's armored Panzer force was not especially impressive at the start of the war. In the invasions of Poland and France, the German forces were mostly made up of the Panzer I and Panzer II light tanks. The Panzer I was little more than a training vehicle armed only with machine guns; the Panzer II with a 20 mm cannon. The Panzer division also included some Czech designed light tanks—the Panzer 35(t) and the Panzer 38(t).

===== American =====
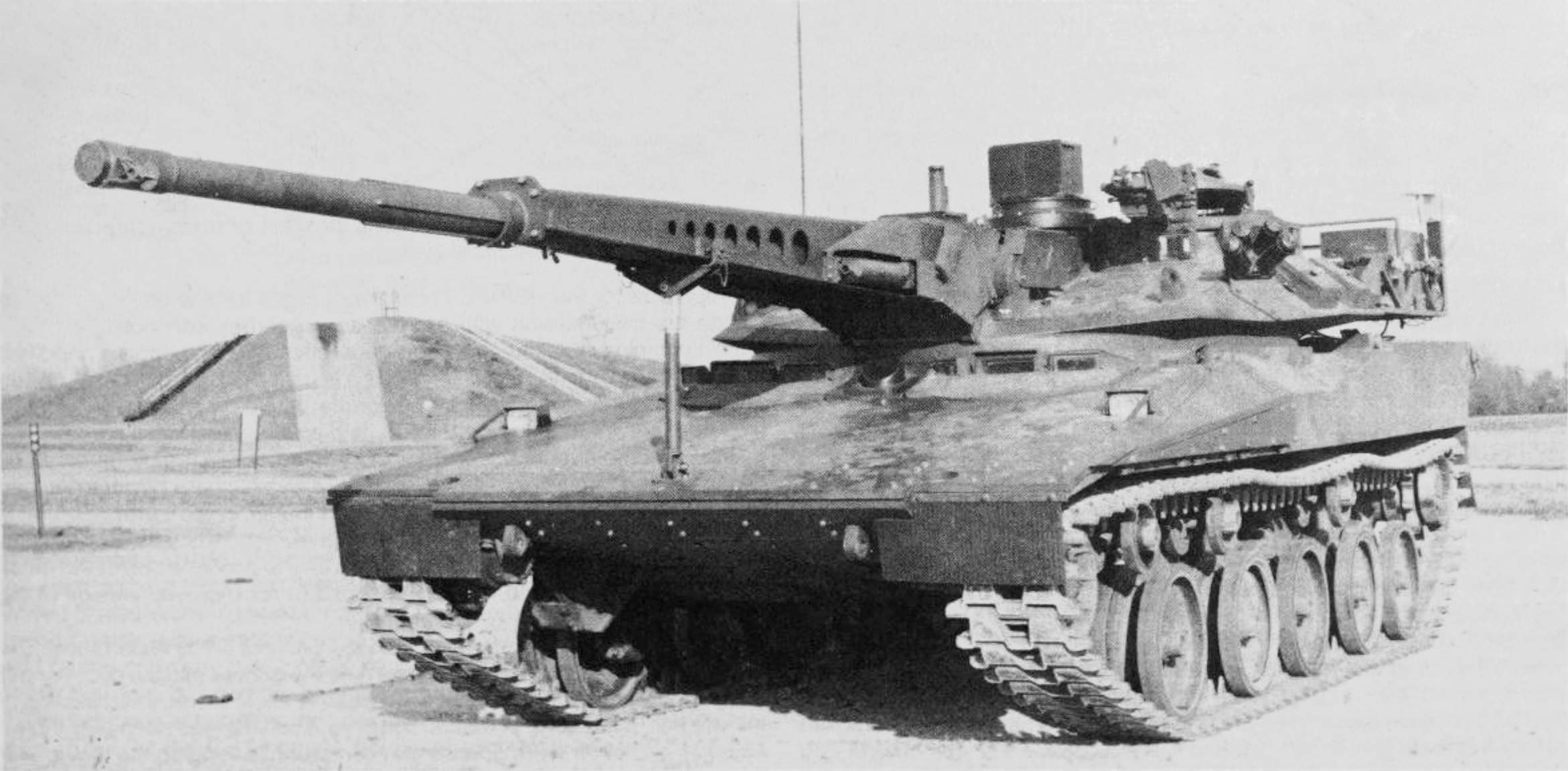
High Survivability Test Vehicle (Lightweight), an early 1980s concept utilizing a rapid-fire 75 mm gun

American light tank development started with the M2 light tank series. These light tanks were mechanically very reliable, with good mobility. However, they had a high silhouette, and only a few saw combat. The M3 Stuart series was an improvement of the M2 with better armor. The new medium tank just entering production in 1940 was the M2A1. This was a poor design with thin armor and a high silhouette.

A parallel development of the M2 was the M1 light tank, initially designated a "combat car" as the cavalry was not allowed to operate tanks. When this restriction was removed, they were re-designated as tanks. The M1 light tank was armed only with machine guns, and was realized to be ineffective before the outbreak of war. It nevertheless saw combat in the Philippines Campaign, but afterward used only in a training role.

The M3 Stuart saw use in the North African Campaign but was relegated to reconnaissance as soon as US-built medium tanks became available. Further light tank development in the war led to the improved M5 Stuart and then included the M24 Chaffee.

Light tanks were issued to tank battalions (one of the four companies was a light tank company), light tank battalions and cavalry reconnaissance squadrons. The original role of the light tank in these formations was similar to medium tanks and they were expected to engage enemy armor with AP rounds and enemy positions with HE rounds. As a result, tank gunnery training for light and medium tankers was common.

US Army Field Manuals written before 1944 clearly show that light tanks were to be part of an armored assault on enemy positions, and examples of fire on enemy armor were in these manuals. When pursuing an enemy, Light Tank Battalions were expected to move parallel with enemy columns and, together with accompanying infantry and engineer units, seize "critical terrain that will block hostile retreat". Despite the fact that light tank platoons were not expected to function as a reconnaissance unit, they could be used for reconnaissance purposes. In this role, they were expected to remain behind the main reconnaissance force as the support element and augment the firepower whenever enemy contact was made.

===== British =====
The British withdrew their light tank designs from their armored divisions early in the war, but used some later designs for minor amphibious operations and airborne operations. In general they used armored cars for reconnaissance and the last of the light tank designs, the light tank Mk VIII "Harry Hopkins", was produced only in small numbers.

===== Japan =====
The Japanese made extensive use of light tanks, primarily for infantry support and scouting. They were much better suited to jungle warfare than larger designs. The Type 95 Ha-Go light tank was the main light tank used during the Second Sino-Japanese War, at the Battles of Khalkhin Gol against the Soviet Union, and in the Second World War. It proved sufficient against infantry but was not effective against other tanks. Approximately 2,300 were produced.

The Type 98 Ke-Ni light tank was designed to replace the Type 95 Ha-Go. It was developed in 1938 to address deficiencies in the Type 95 design already apparent from combat experience in Manchukuo and China. The Imperial Japanese Army General Staff realized that the Type 95 was vulnerable to heavy machine gun fire–0.5 in (13 mm)–so it determined the development of a new light tank with the same weight as the Type 95, but with thicker armor was needed. Type 98 tank production did not begin until 1942. It had a two-man turret, an improvement on the asymmetrical turret used on the Type 95, carrying a Type 100 37 mm tank gun, with a muzzle velocity of 760 m/s (2,500 ft/s) and a 7.7 mm machine-gun in a coaxial mount. A total of 104 Type 98s are known to have been built.

==== Cold War ====
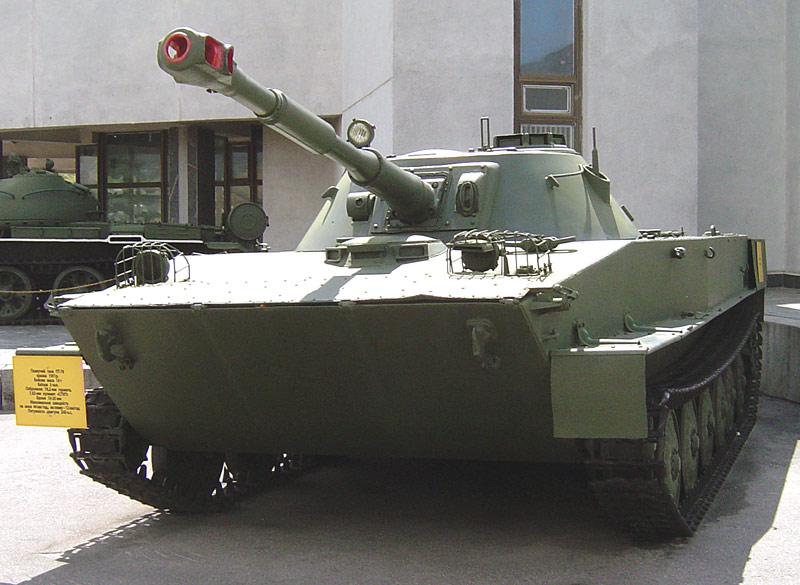
The PT-76, a Soviet light tank especially designed for amphibious ability

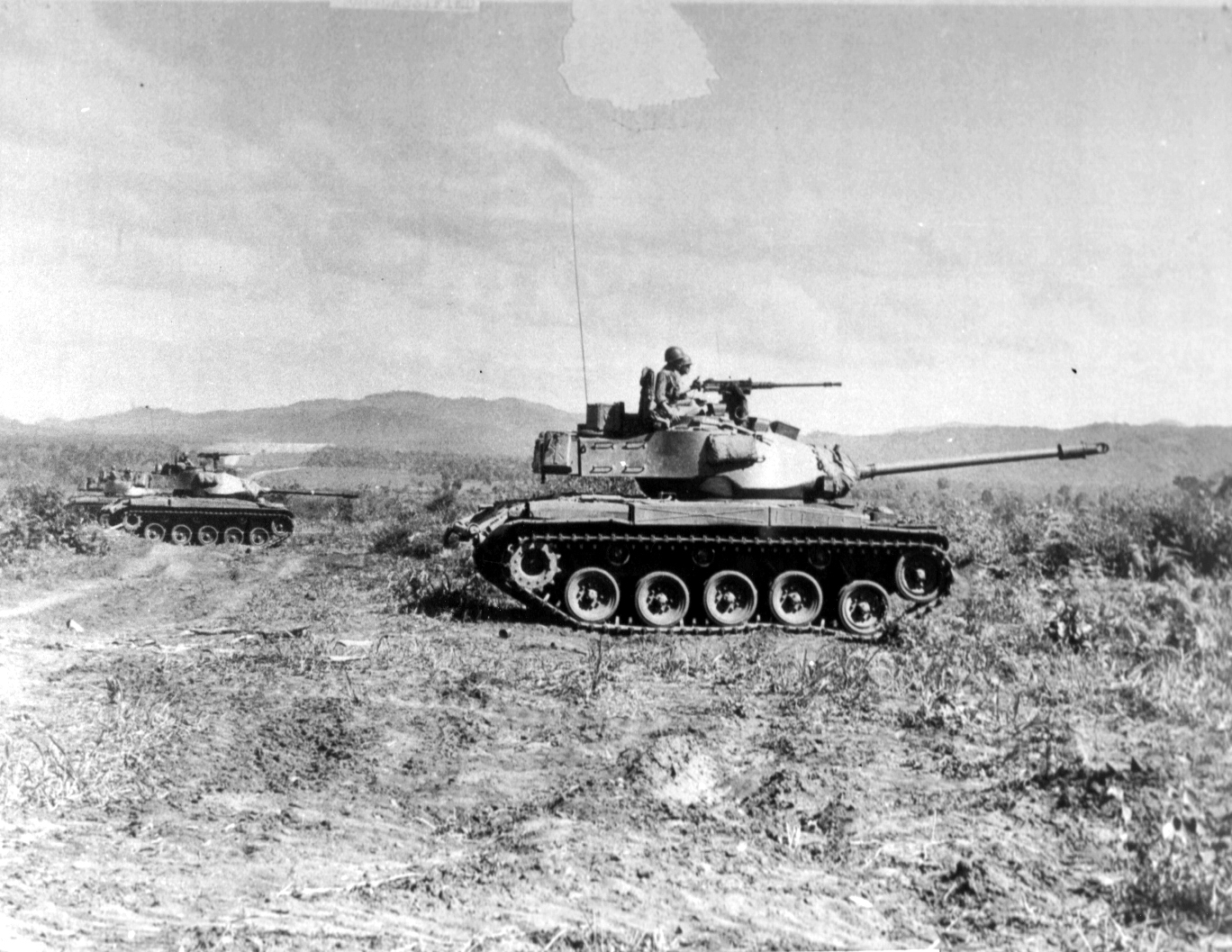
South Vietnamese M41 Walker Bulldog tanks during a training operation

Light tanks continued to be built, but for very limited roles such as amphibious reconnaissance, support of airborne units, and in rapid-intervention forces that were not expected to face enemy tanks. The Soviet PT-76 is a specialized light tank –amphibious with sufficient firepower to engage other reconnaissance vehicles, but very lightly armored, protecting only against rifle-calibre rounds and small shrapnel fragments. The US fielded small numbers of the M41 Walker Bulldog with a high velocity 76mm gun, and better armor, but it suffered from range limits, and its weight was too heavy for most air transport of the day. The US M551 Sheridan had similar strengths and weaknesses, but could also be airdropped, either by parachute or LAPES. The French had their AMX-13 light tank, which was designed for its capability to be quickly air-dropped for use with paratroopers and also able to support lightly armed infantry and perform force-reconnaissance effectively.

The British FV101 Scorpion, the fire support variant of the Combat Vehicle Reconnaissance (Tracked) series of vehicles that replaced armored cars in British service, has been described as a light tank and was sold to many smaller nations. Another light tank in the Cold War era was the Swedish Ikv 91 (classified as an assault gun by Sweden). It had a low-pressure 90mm gun, strong armor against 20mm grenades, and it was fully amphibious.

==== Post–Cold War ====
Light tanks, such as the PT-76, continue to play a small role in tank warfare, although many are losing favor to cheaper, faster, and lighter armored cars. The light tank still fills an important niche in many armies, especially for nations with airborne divisions, Marine Infantry, or those without the resources and funding for main battle tanks. They have important advantages over heavier tanks in Southeast Asia and other nations in the Equatorial region. Their compact dimensions and short-to-nonexistent barrel overhang lets them maneuver through thick rain forests, and their weight reduces the risk of getting stuck in mud, and simplifies recovery of stuck or damaged tanks. This makes the light tank the preferred choice for infantry support in Equatorial nations. Post–Cold War light tanks include the Stingray, ZTQ-15, M8 Armored Gun System and Kaplan MT / Harimau. Light tanks based on infantry fighting vehicles chassis include the CV90105T, 2S25 Sprut-SD, Tanque Argentino Mediano, ASCOD LT 105, K21-105, and Sabrah.

== 21st century light tank design ==
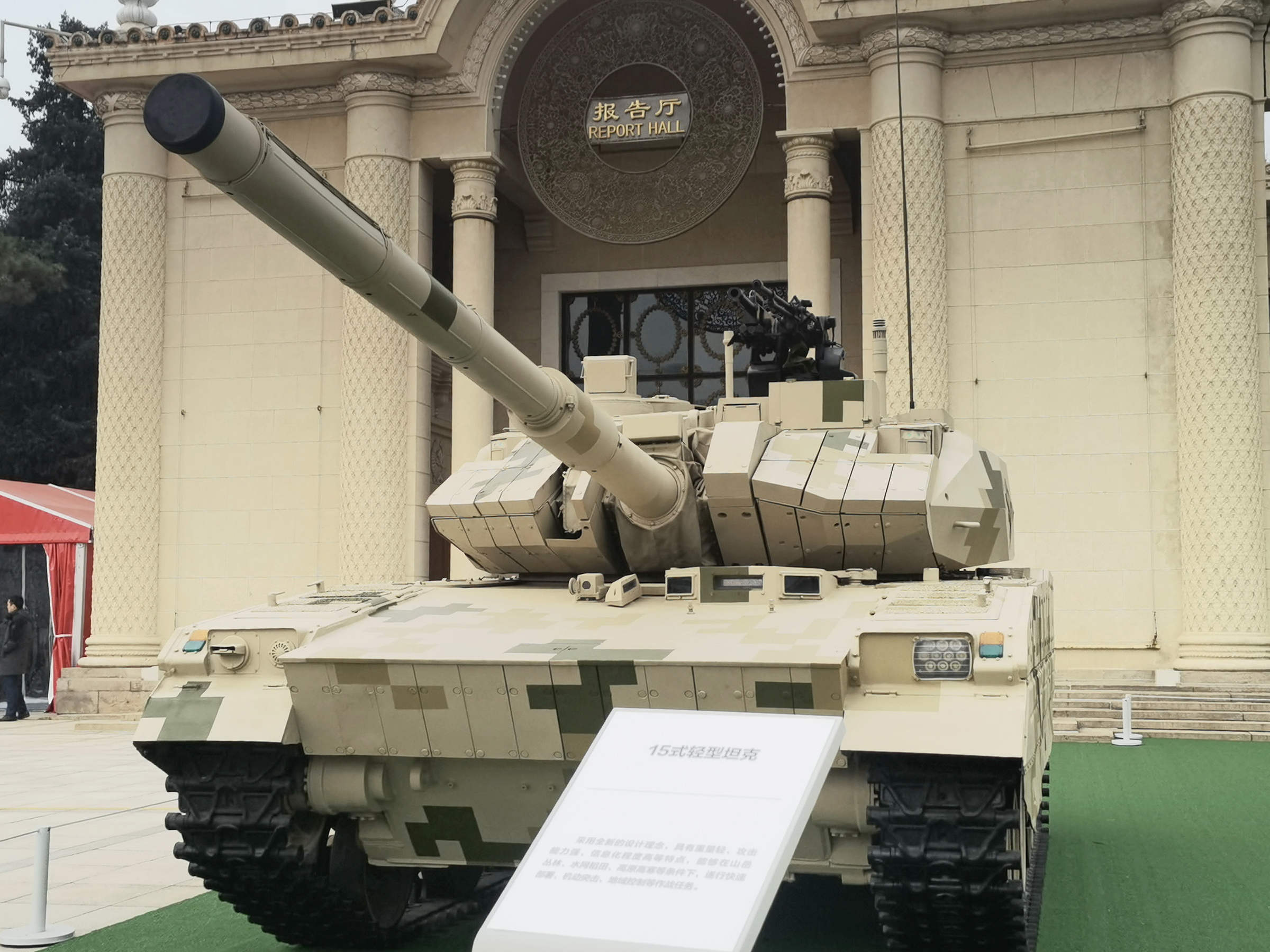
Chinese Type 15 light tank is specifically designed for high altitude warfare and produced in large quantities.

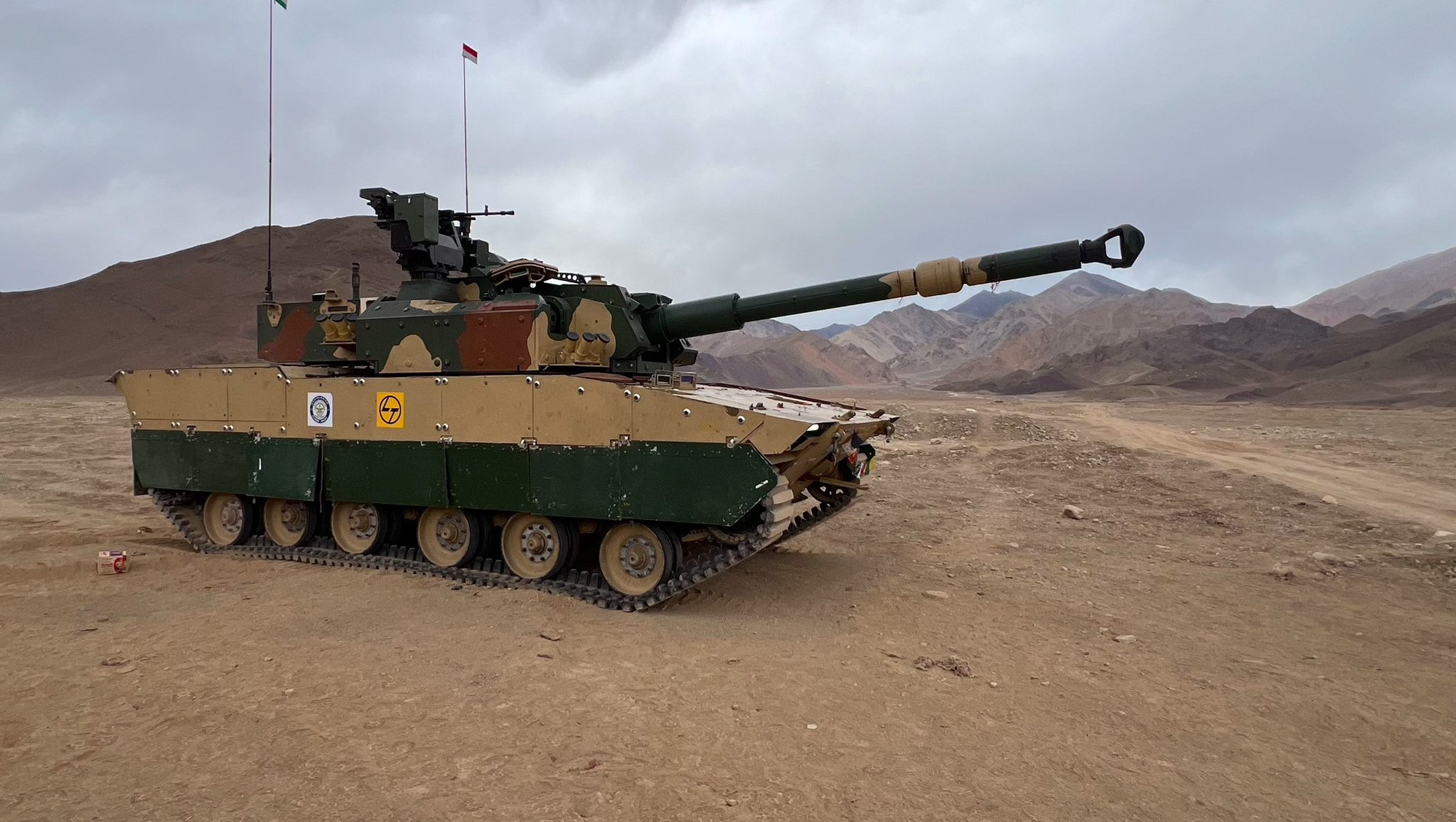
Zorawar LT prototype for the Indian Army. The tank is specifically designed for high altitude warfare.

=== Role ===
The modern light tank supplements the main battle tank in expeditionary roles and situations where all major threats have been neutralized and excessive weight in armor and armament would only hinder mobility and cost more money to operate. They have also been used for reconnaissance and, in some cases, infantry support. The Chinese Type 15 and Indian Zorawar LT are specially designed to operate in high altitude mountainous areas. The Type-15 tank is fitted with explosive reactive armor, remote weapon system, and laser warning receivers for multi-layered protection. Trials of the tank Zorawar LT are ongoing with a requirement of 350 tanks in service.

=== Countermeasures ===
Typically, the armor in contemporary light tanks is modular, sometimes up to three configurations.

The flat hull necessary for amphibious light tanks to plane across the surface of the water is not nearly as blast-resistant as the V-shaped hull. It has been suggested that underbelly armor appliqué could be applied after the light tanks come ashore and before they encounter explosive devices.

=== Weapons ===
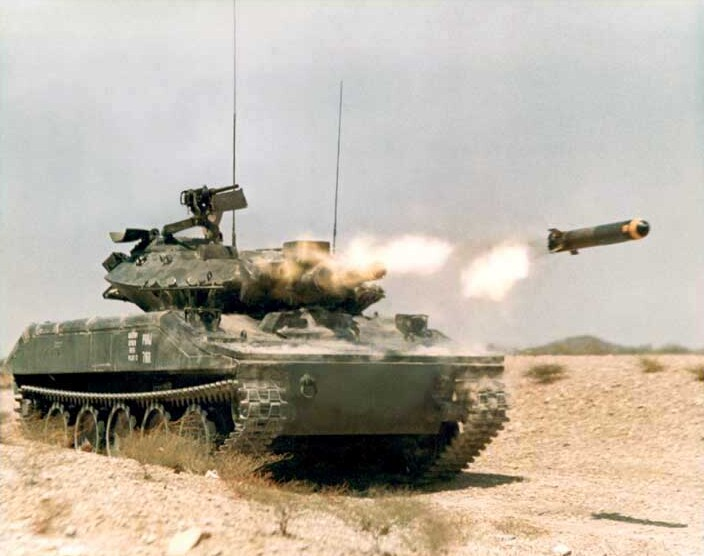
M551 Sheridan firing a Shillelagh guided missile

A gun capable of defeating modern tanks at reasonable ranges requires a large vehicle to carry it. Gun weight is typically the product of caliber and muzzle velocity. Large caliber guns on light tanks often sacrifice muzzle velocity in interest of saving weight. These guns are effective against close-quarter targets but lack the power and/or accuracy to effectively engage heavier vehicles at a distance.

=== Mobility ===
==== Tactical mobility ====
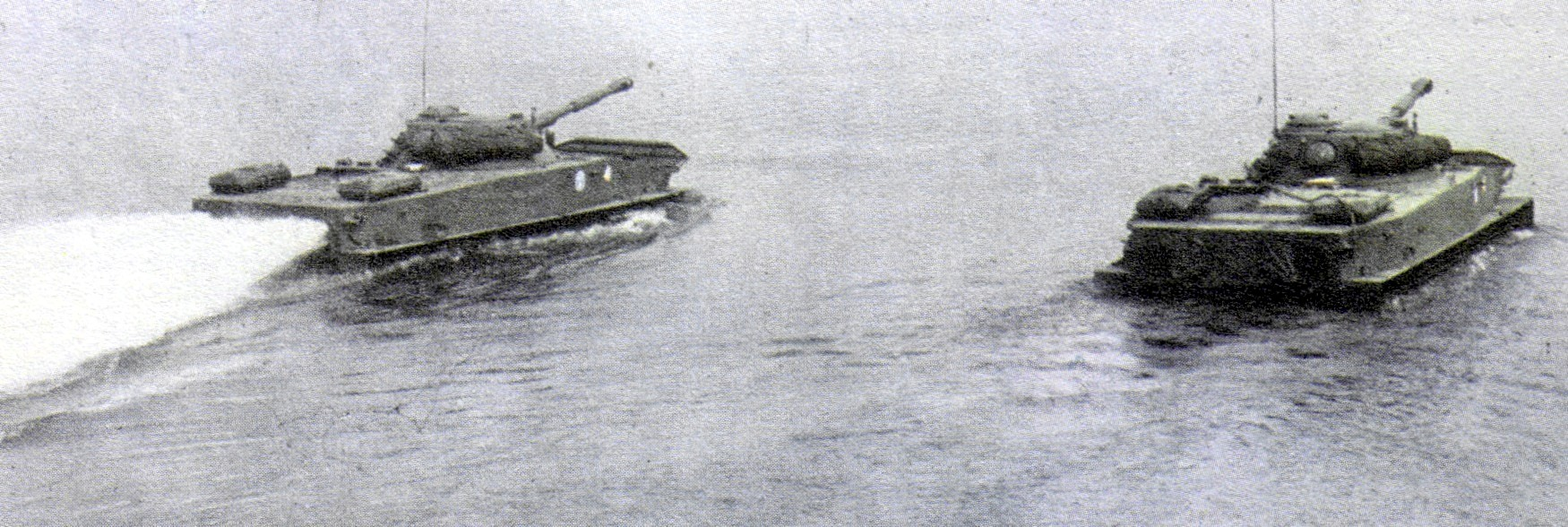
The design of the PT-76 allows for easy transition from land to water with little preparation

Some light tanks such as the PT-76 are amphibious, typically being propelled in the water by hydrojets or by their tracks. Most amphibious light tanks weigh little and often utilize aluminum armor. Some light tanks require no modifications for river crossings. Crews simply raise the easily accessible cloth sides around the hull, cover the hatches, turn on the bilge pump and shift the transmission to water operations. Often, a fold down trim vane is erected to stop water from flooding into the hatch.

==== Strategic mobility ====
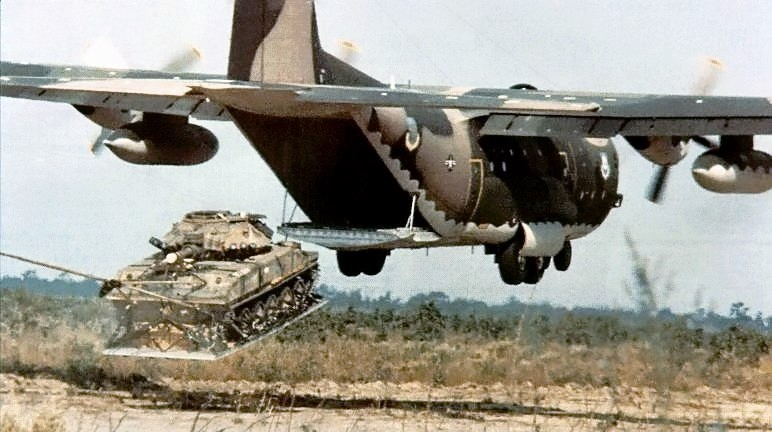
A C-130 delivering an M551 Sheridan (now retired from service) using a low-altitude parachute-extraction system (LAPES).

Some light tanks, such as the M551 Sheridan, Type 15 and 2S25 Sprut-SD armored reconnaissance vehicle, could be rigged for low-velocity airdrops from transport aircraft. The crew does not ride in the tank during parachute insertion, but parachutes from another plane. Upon landing, they go to their tank, release the lines, and drive it away.

== See also ==
- Main battle tank
- Tankette
- Light tanks of the United Kingdom
- History of the tank
- Tanks in World War I
- Comparison of World War I tanks
- Tanks of the interwar period
- Tanks in World War II
- Tanks in the Cold War
- Tanks of the post–Cold War era
- Armoured fighting vehicle

== Bibliography ==
- Bishop, Chris (2002). The Encyclopedia of Weapons of World War II: The Comprehensive Guide to Over 1,500 Weapons Systems, Including Tanks, Small Arms, Warplanes, Artillery, Ships and Submarines. Sterling Publishing Company, Inc. ISBN 1-58663-762-2.
- Chamberlain, Peter; Ellis, Chris (2001). British and American Tanks of World War Two: The Complete Illustrated History of British, American, and Commonwealth Tanks 1933–1945. Cassell & Company. ISBN 0-7110-2898-2.
- Coox, Alvin D. Nomonhan; Japan Against Russia, 1939. Two volumes, 1985. Stanford University Press. ISBN 0-8047-1160-7.
- Doherty, Richard (2007). The British Reconnaissance Corps in World War II. Osprey Publishing. ISBN 978-1-84603-122-9.
- Fitzsimons, Bernard, ed. (1978). The Illustrated Encyclopedia of 20th Century Weapons & Warfare. Vol. 16. Phoebus. ISBN 9780839361756.
- Fletcher, David (1989a). The Great Tank Scandal: British Armour in the Second World War - Part 1. HMSO. ISBN 978-0-11-290460-1.
- Fletcher, David (1989b). Universal Tank: British Armour in the Second World War - Part 2. HMSO. ISBN 0-11-290534-X.
- Harclerode, Peter (2005). Wings Of War – Airborne Warfare 1918–1945. Weidenfeld & Nicolson. ISBN 0-304-36730-3.
- Jackson, Robert (2010). 101 Great Tanks. Roseb Pub Group. ISBN 978-1-4358-3595-5.
- Otway, Lieutenant-Colonel T.B.H. (1990). The Second World War 1939–1945 Army – Airborne Forces. Imperial War Museum. ISBN 0-901627-57-7.
- Tucker, Spencer (2004). Tanks: An Illustrated History of Their Impact. ABC-CLIO. ISBN 1-57607-995-3.
- Zaloga, Steven J. (2007). Japanese Tanks 1939–45. Osprey. ISBN 978-1-8460-3091-8.
- Zaloga, Steven J. (2008). Armored Thunderbolt, the US Army Sherman in World War II. Mechanicsville, PA (USA): Stackpole Books. ISBN 978-0-8117-0424-3.
