= M2 light tank =

1930s United States light tank

Light Tank, M2
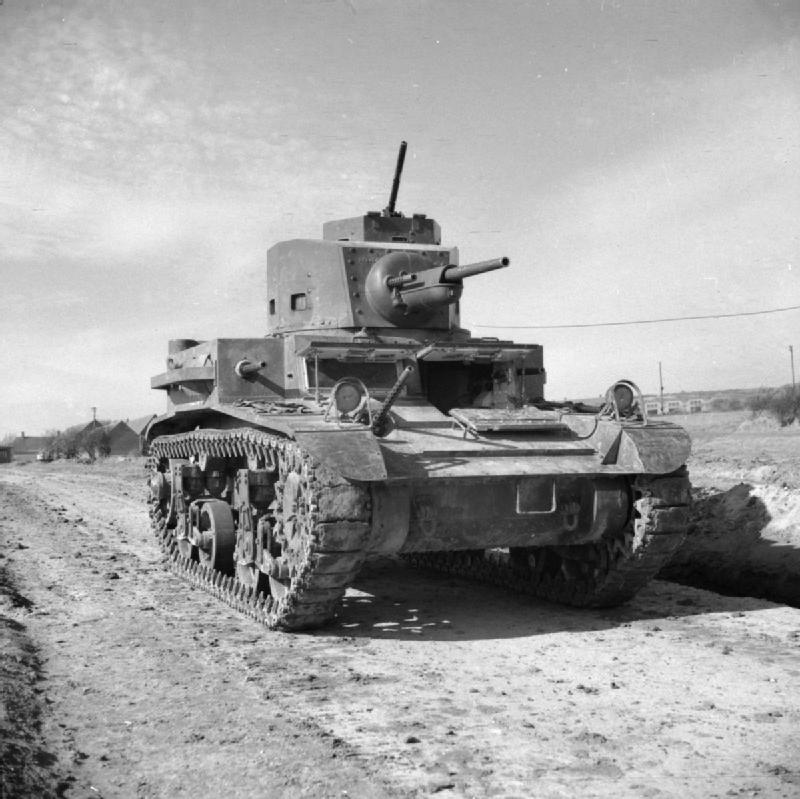
- M2A4 light tank in British service, 11 March 1942
- Type: Light tank
- Place of origin: United States

Production history
- Designer: Rock Island Arsenal
- Manufacturer: Rock Island Arsenal (M2-M2A3), American Car & Foundry Company (M2A4)
- Unit cost: $25,000 (M2A4, 1939 estimate)
- Produced: 1935–42
- No. built: 698

Specifications (M2A4)
- Mass: 11.6 t (26,000 lb)
- Length: 14 ft 6 in (4.42 m)
- Width: 8 ft 1 in (2.46 m)
- Height: 8 ft 8 in (2.64 m)
- Crew: 4 (Commander/loader, gunner, driver, co-driver)
- Armor: 6–25 mm (0.24–0.98 in)
- Main armament: 37 mm gun M5; 103 rounds
- Secondary armament: 5x .30-06 (7.62 mm) Browning M1919A4 machine guns 8,470 rounds
- Engine: Continental R-670-9A, 7-cylinder, radial gasoline 250 hp (190 kW)
- Suspension: Vertical volute spring suspension
- Operational range: 200 mi (320 km)
- Maximum speed: 36 mph (58 km/h)

The M2 light tank, officially Light Tank, M2, was an American light tank of the interwar period which saw limited service during World War II. The most common model, the M2A4, was equipped with one 37 mm (1.5 in) M5 gun and five .30 cal M1919 Browning machine guns.

It was originally developed from the prototype T2 light tank built by the Rock Island Arsenal, which had a Vickers-type leaf spring suspension. The suspension was replaced by the superior vertical volute system in the T2E1 series of 1935. This was put into production with minor modifications as the M2A1 in 1936, with ten produced. The main pre-war version was the M2A2, with 239 produced, becoming the main tank of the United States Army during the interwar period. The Spanish Civil War showed that tanks armed only with machine guns were ineffective. This led to the M2A4 with a 37 mm gun as the main armament. A total of 375 were delivered, the last ten as late as April 1942.

The tank's only combat service was with the United States Marine Corps' 1st Tank Battalion in 1942 during the Pacific War. While some sources claim that the M2A4 saw action with British Army tank units in the Burma campaign against the Imperial Japanese Armed Forces, historian Mike Green states that the tanks were never issued to combat units. The M2A4 light tank led to the development of the M3 Stuart light tank which saw widespread use throughout World War II.

== Development history ==
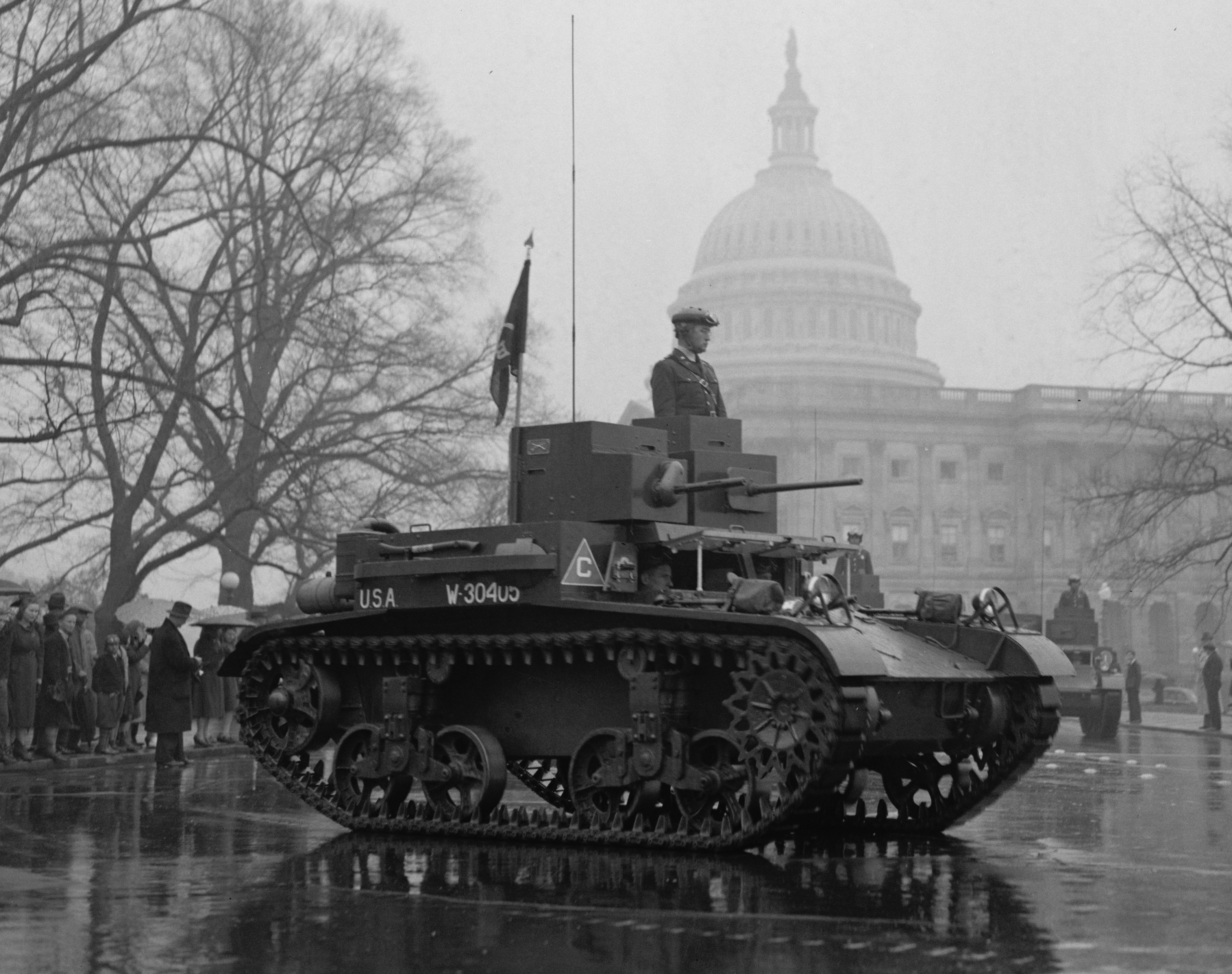
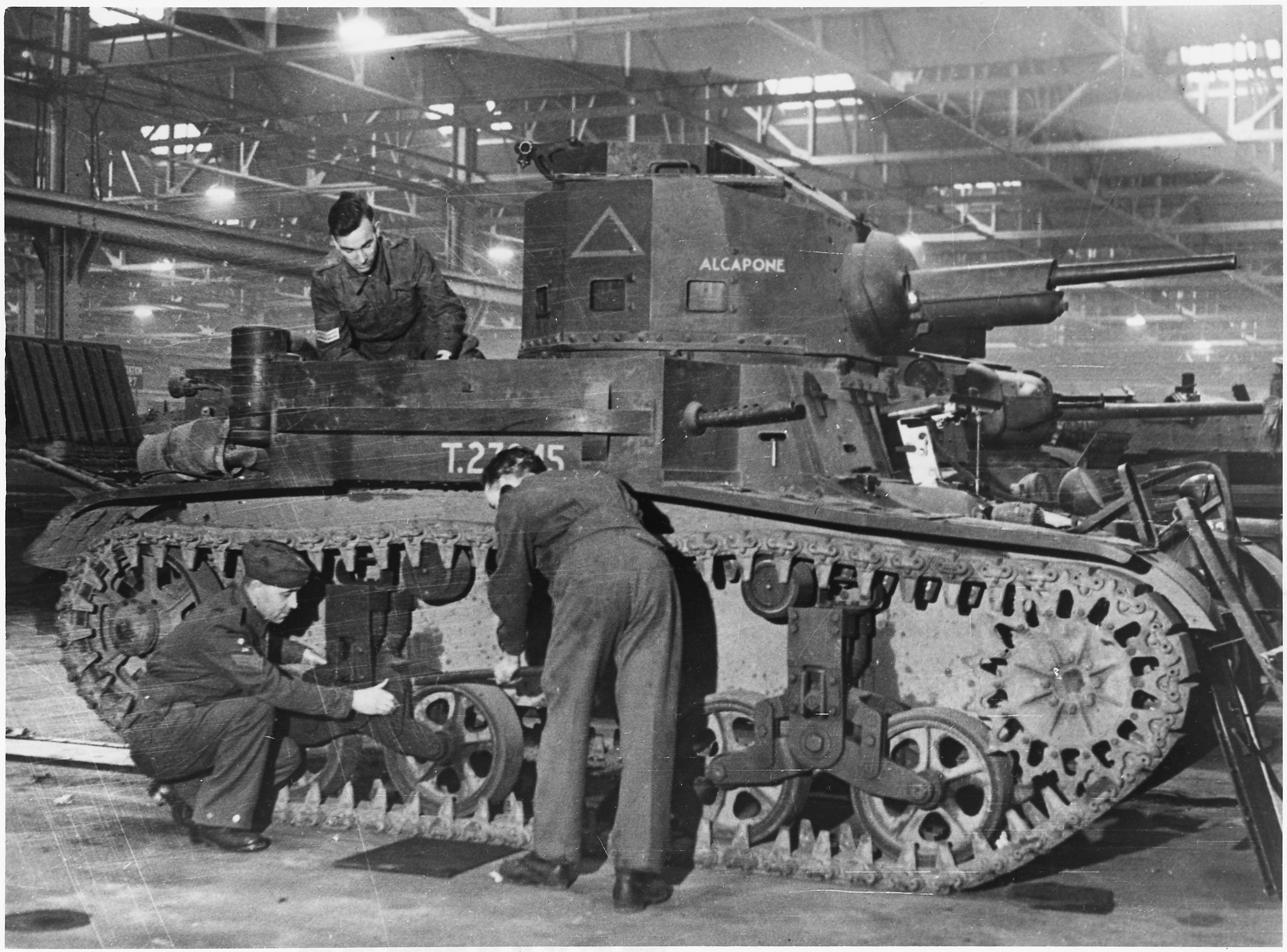
Top: M2A3 in annual Army Day Parade, Washington, 1939. Bottom: Fitters assembling an M2A4 light tank at a British ordnance depot.

US Army infantry tank design started with the light tank, T1 during the 1920s, which developed into a series of experimental designs which did not enter production. The T2 concept, starting five years later, incorporated several design lessons from the T1, but used a new suspension system copied from the British Vickers six-ton tank. The first prototype was delivered in 1933.

The Defense Act of 1920 had defined tanks to be used in support of the infantry. Through the 1920s a number of theorists outlined an independent role for the tank that required it to move at high speed into the rear areas, a modern version of the cavalry. The British referred to these designs as "cruiser tanks", but similar high-speed designs were developed under a variety of names. As the Defense Act limited tank development to the infantry, the United States Cavalry began tank development under the name "combat car". In keeping with the high-speed role, the new T5 combat car introduced the new vertical volute spring suspension (VVSS) system, which proved clearly superior to the Vickers leaf spring system.

This led to a second prototype of the T2, the T2E1, in April 1934, adopting the VVSS from the T5. The T2E1 was armed with one .30 cal (7.62 mm) and one .50 inch (12.7 mm) Browning machine gun mounted in a fixed turret; another .30 cal Browning was mounted on the hull front. The T2E1 was selected for production in 1935 as the M2, which mounted only the M2 Browning in a small one-man turret, and the .30 cal in the hull.

After only 10 units were delivered, the Infantry Branch decided to switch to a twin turret configuration in the M2E2, with a .30-caliber (7.62 mm) machine gun in a second turret. These early twin-turret tanks were given the nickname "Mae West" by the troops, after the popular busty movie star. The twin-turret layout was inefficient, but was a common feature of 1930s light tanks derived from the Vickers. Further refinements to the M2A2 produced the A3 model, which incorporated a modified suspension system that reduced the tank's ground pressure. The weight increased to 10 tons.

Following the Spanish Civil War, most armies, including the U.S. Army, realized that they needed tanks armed with cannon and not merely with machine guns. The Cavalry had already opted for a single, larger turret on its nearly identical M1 combat car. In December 1938, OCM No. 14844 directed that a single M2A3 be removed from the assembly line and modified with heavier armor and weapons, to meet the standards of the U.S. Infantry. This vehicle, after conversion, was re-designated as the M2A4. It was equipped with an M5 37 mm main gun, 1 inch (25 mm) thick armor, and a seven-cylinder gasoline engine. Other upgrades included improved suspension, improved transmission, and better engine cooling. Production of the M2A4 began in May 1940 at the American Car and Foundry Company, and continued through March 1941; an additional ten M2A4s were assembled in April 1942, for a total production run of 375 M2A4 light tanks.

=== Successor vehicles ===
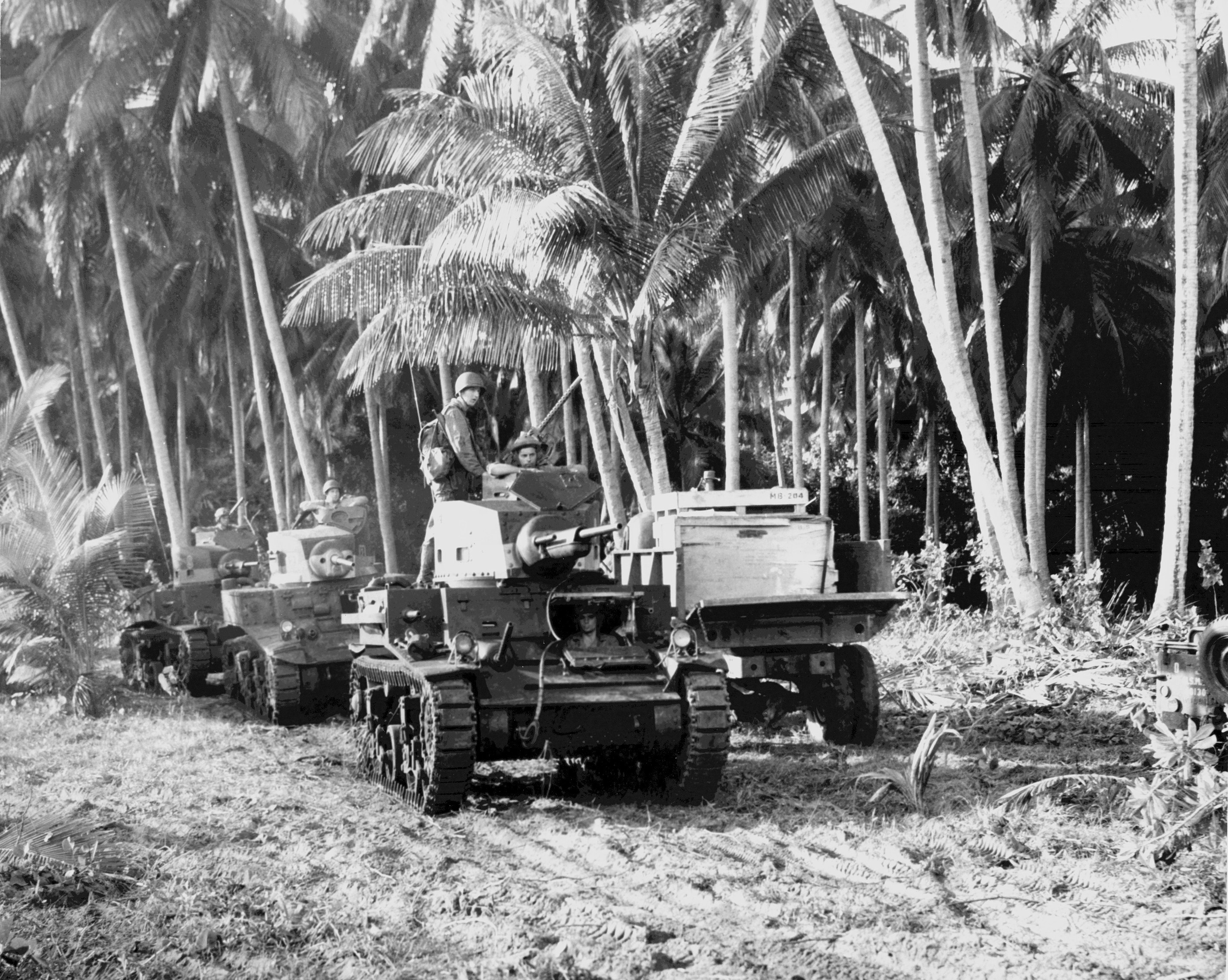
An M2A4 on Guadalcanal, followed by an M3 Stuart and another M2A4

The M2 light tank led to the US M3-series and M5-series light tanks. The Ordnance Department viewed the M2A4 as a stopgap tank; work to improve it further began in June 1940. The first M3 Stuart tanks began to be produced in March 1941; the original riveted M3s closely resembled the M2A4, and the two types occasionally served in the same units; an easy recognition feature was the rear idler wheel. On the M2A4, the idler was raised; on the M3 it trailed on the ground, increasing the flotation of the heavier vehicle. The M3 retained the same Continental W-670 engine, but incorporated ½-inch thicker (1½ inch total thickness) armor; with weight increased to 14 tons. The tank initially kept the same 37 mm gun and the forward firing hull machine guns, but the turret incorporated improvements. Eventually over 4,500 examples of all variants were produced.

== Operational use ==
By December 1941, the M2A1, M2A2 and M2A3 were used for training only. The majority of M2A4s, which went to the US Army, were also used only for training between 1940 and 1942. The US Marine Corps ordered M3 Stuart tanks to outfit its armored units in 1940, but as the new tank was not yet in production, it received 36 M2A4s, after which point production of the M3 had come on line. Many of these tanks were deployed during the Battle of Guadalcanal while assigned to A Company, 1st Tank Battalion, where they and M3 Stuarts were typically spread out among infantry units. Their use was generally limited to providing mobile fire support to the Marines, either in disabling Japanese bunkers or using canister shot against Japanese attacks. In defensive engagements, the M2A4s and Stuarts would deploy in pairs, so they could cover each other with machine gun fire against Japanese soldiers armed with satchel charges.

Ultimately, the Marine Corps determined that the 37 mm guns of the M2s and M3s were not powerful enough to defeat Japanese bunkers, and so they would be replaced with tanks armed with 75 mm guns. Following the end of the Guadalcanal campaign, A Company returned to Australia, where the M2A4s were replaced with the new M4 Shermans in preparation for the Battle of Cape Gloucester in December 1943. They remained in service in some areas of the Pacific Theater until 1943. After they served in the Pacific, they were used for training.

Britain ordered 100 M2A4s in early 1941. After 36 of them were delivered, the order was canceled in favor of an improved M3 Stuart. The fate of these vehicles is unclear. There is evidence that indicates these tanks were shipped from North Africa, as part of the British Army's 7th Hussars and 2nd Royal Tank Regiment, to India and potentially were subsequently used in the Burma campaigns against the Japanese 14th Tank Regiment.

== Design ==
Besides the machine gun mounted coaxially to the main gun, there were three .30 cal. machine guns in the hull. One was mounted in a ball mount in front of the bow gunner. The other two were mounted in fixed sponson mounts. These machine guns were fired by the driver; they were aimed by pointing the entire tank at the desired target. Another .30 cal machine gun was normally mounted on the top of the turret for anti-aircraft defense.

The 37 mm M5 gun had a manually operated breechblock. The tank commander doubled as loader, like many other tanks of the time. There was no turret basket in the M2A4 light tank; the commander stood on the right side, while the gunner stood on the left side. The commander turned the turret onto the general direction of target. The gunner would then bring the target into the M5 telescopic sight. The M20 combination mount had 20° of traverse; this could either be by a handwheel driving the rack and pinion traverse gear mechanism or pressure on the gunners shoulder rest overcoming the friction in the mechanism. Depression and elevation of the gun was either through a geared mechanism or, with the gears disengaged, free through movement of the gunner's shoulder rest.

== Variants ==
- M2A1 (1935)
  - Initial production type with single fixed turret containing one .50 cal machine gun. Seventeen units were produced.
- M2A2 (1935)
  - Twin turrets with single M2 Browning .50 machine gun in its left turret, and an M1919A4 .30 machine gun in its right turret; the turrets partly obstructed each other limiting fields of fire. Dubbed "Mae West". 237 units produced from 1935 to 1937.

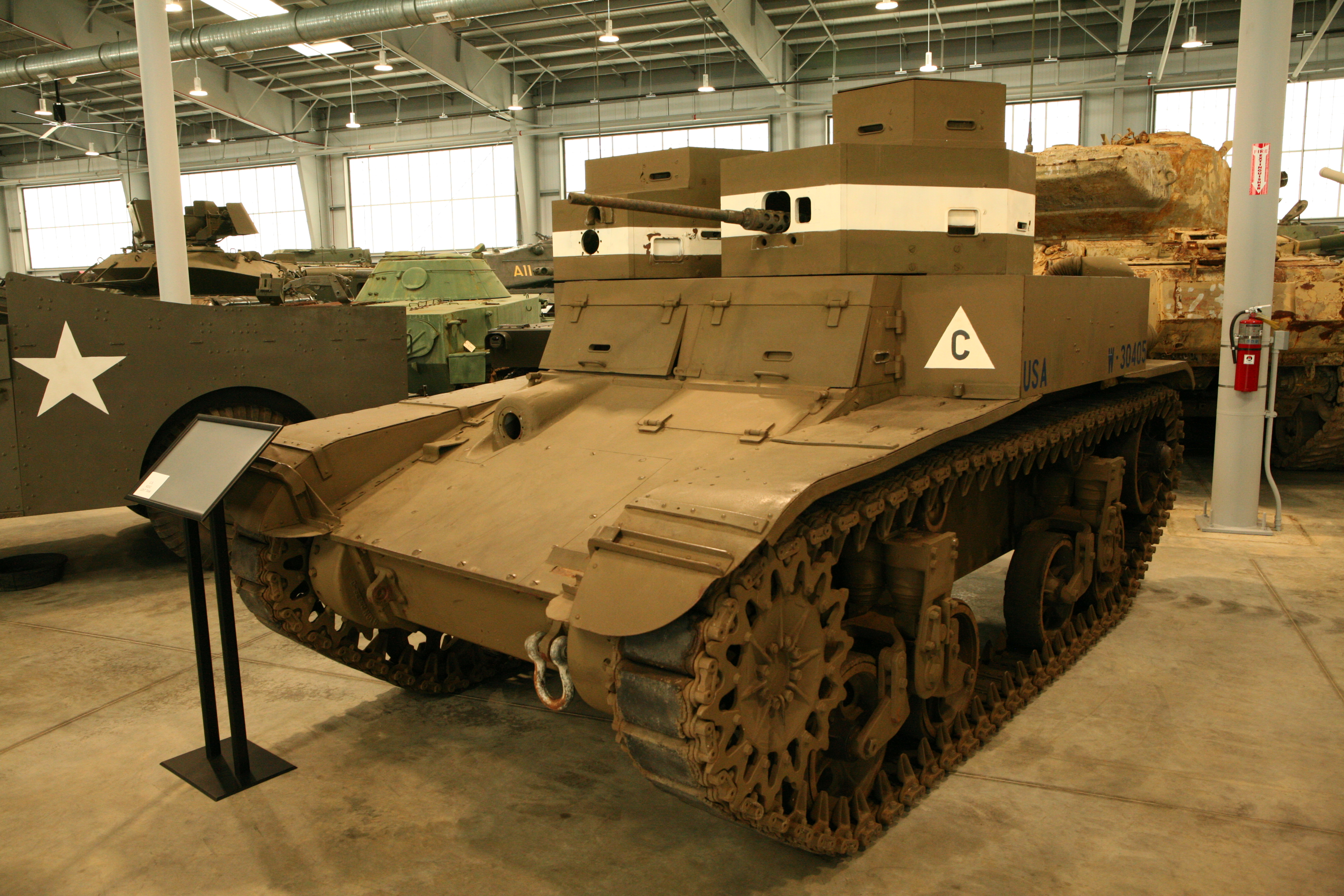
M2A3 "Mae West" on display at the U.S. Army Armor & Cavalry Collection, Fort Benning, Georgia, in 2023

- M2A3 (1938)
  - Twin turrets with two machine guns, thicker armor at 22 mm, slightly lengthened hull, improved engine access, increased gear ratios, better engine cooling, improved suspension, and other minor detail changes. 73 units produced.
- M2A4 (1939)
  - Single turret with 37mm gun. Thicker armor. 375 units produced, of which 40 in 1941 and 10 in 1942. Orders went to the American Car & Foundry in October 1939 upon request by the Ordnance Department. Used in the early Pacific campaigns and training. Only service was in Guadalcanal. Used for training after December 1941.
- M2 AT (1937)
  - An M2 chassis with the turret removed and replaced with a 47mm automatic gun. The gun penetration was deemed poor and canceled in 1937.

== Specifications (M2A4) ==
The M2A4 was 14 ft 6 in (4.42 m) long, 8 ft 1 in (2.46 m) wide, 8 ft 8 in (2.64 m) high, and weighed 11.6 t (26,000 lb). It had a vertical volute spring suspension and had a speed of 36 mph (58 km/h), and had a range of 200 mi (320 km). It had one M5 37 mm gun (with 103 rounds), and five .30/06 cal M1919A4 Browning machine guns (with 8,470 rounds) with 6 to 25 mm of armor. It had a 250 hp (190 kW) Continental W-670 9A seven-cylinder radial engine. The vehicle was operated by a crew of four (commander/gunner, loader, driver, and co-driver).

== See also ==
- List of "M" series military vehicles
- G-numbers

== Sources ==
- Berndt, Thomas (1994). American Tanks of World War II. Minnesota, MN: MBI Publishing Company. ISBN 0-87938-930-3.
- Chamberlain, Peter; Ellis, Chris (1969). British and American Tanks of World War II. New York: Arco Publishing. ISBN 0-668-01867-4.
- Foss, Christopher F. (1981). An Illustrated Guide to World War II Tanks and Fighting Vehicles. New York: Arco Publishing. ISBN 978-0-6680-5232-0.
- Green, Mike (2014). American Tanks & AFVs of World War II. Oxford: Osprey Publishing. ISBN 978-1-7820-0931-3.
- Hunnicutt, R. P. (1992). Stuart: A History of the American Light Tank. Navato, California: Presidio Press. ISBN 0-89141-462-2.
- Jackson, Robert (2010). 101 Great Tanks. New York: The Rosen Publishing Group. ISBN 978-1-43583-595-5.
- United States War Department Staff (1941). FM 23-80 37-mm Gun Tank M5 (PDF). Washington, DC: United States Government Printing Office. OCLC 41417142.
- Zaloga, Steven (1999). M3 & M5 Stuart Light Tank 1940–45. New Vanguard 33. Oxford: Osprey Publishing. ISBN 1-85532-911-5.
- Zaloga, Steven (2008). Armored Thunderbolt: The US Army Sherman in World War II. Mechanicsburg, Pennsylvania: Stackpole Books. ISBN 978-0-8117-0424-3.
- Zaloga, Steven (2012). US Marine Corps Tanks of World War II. Oxford: Osprey Publishing. ISBN 978-1-8490-8560-1.
