= Tanks in the British Army =

Evolution of British tanks

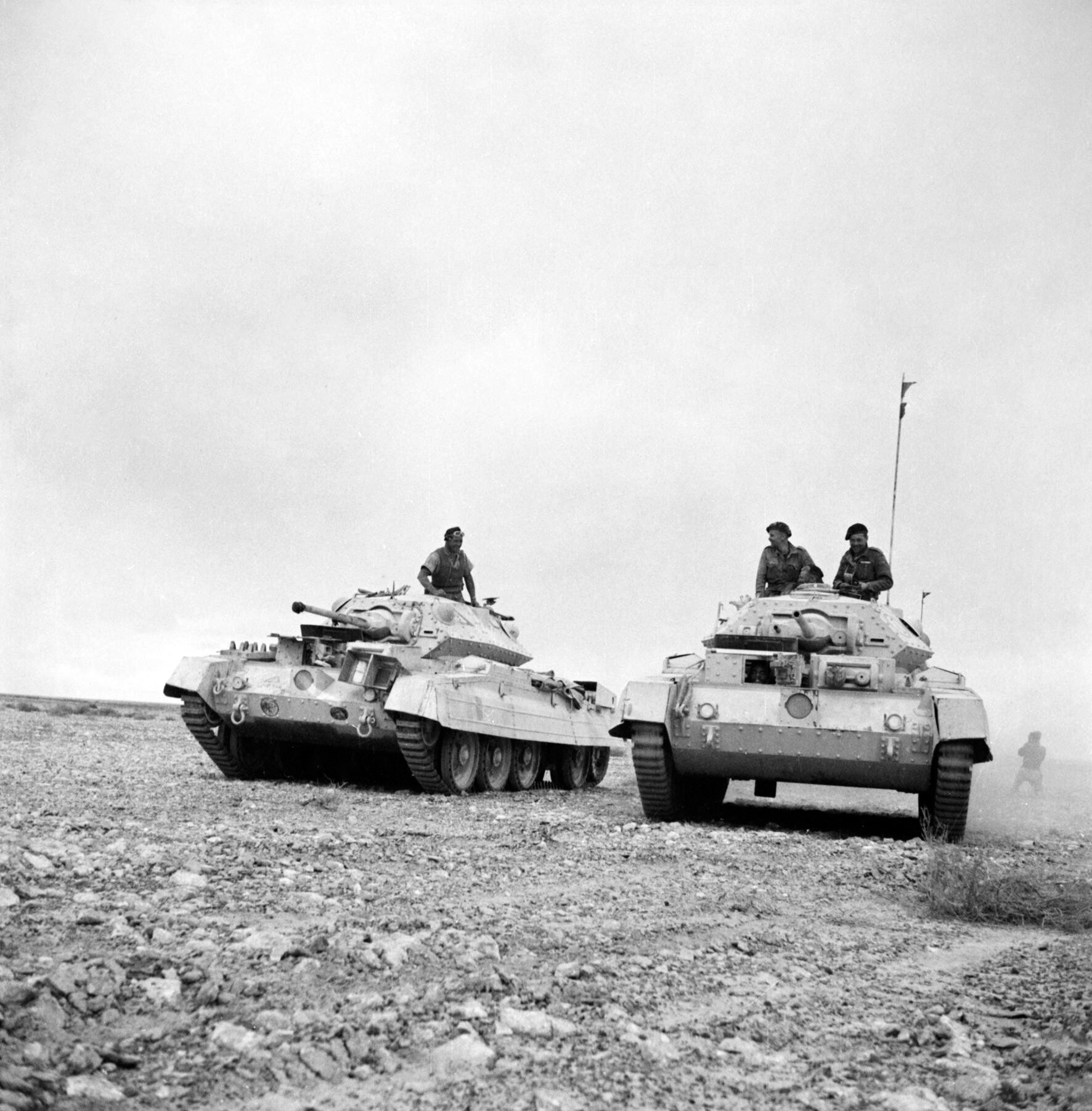
British Crusader tanks moving to forward positions in the Western Desert on 26 November 1941

This article on military tanks deals with the history and development of tanks of the British Army from their first use in the First World War, the interwar period, during the Second World War, the Cold War and modern era.

== Overview ==
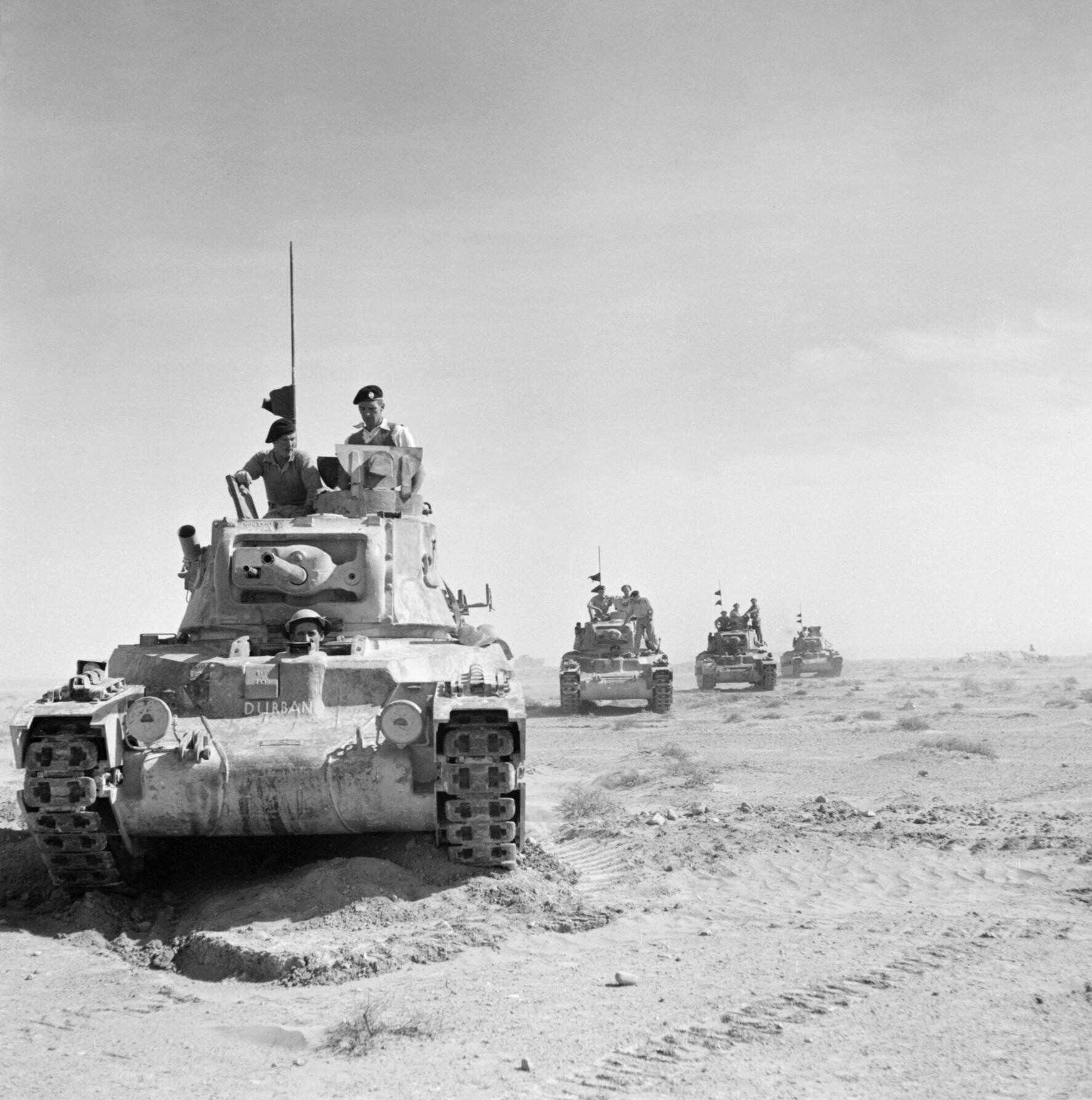
Matilda tanks at Tobruk

Tanks first appeared on the battlefield as a solution to trench warfare. They were large, heavy, slow moving vehicles capable of driving right over the top of enemy trenches; thereby eliminating the need to send soldiers "over the top" only to be blasted to pieces by enemies. The British Army was the first to use them, who built them in secret to begin with. To keep the enemy from finding out about this new solution, the public were informed that the vehicles were large water carriers, or tanks, and the name stuck.

The First World War established the validity of the tank concept. After the war, many nations needed to have tanks, but only a few had the industrial resources to design and build them. During and after the war, Britain and France were the intellectual leaders in tank design, with other countries generally following and adopting their designs. This early lead would be gradually lost during the course of the 1930s to the Soviet Union who with Germany began to design and build their own tanks.

While the First World War saw the first use of the tank as a weapon of war, it was during the Second World War that the tank soon became a dominant force on the battlefield. The British, American, German and Soviet armies all had different approaches to tanks and tank warfare, each with their fair share of successes and failures. The infantry tank was a concept developed by the British and French in the years leading up to the Second World War. Infantry tanks were tanks designed to support the infantry in the attack. To achieve this they were generally heavily armoured compared to the cruiser tanks, to allow them to operate in close concert with infantry even under heavy gun fire. The extra armouring came at the expense of speed, which was not an issue when supporting relatively slow moving infantry.

Once the infantry tank-supported attack had broken through heavily defended areas in the enemy lines, other tanks such as cruisers, or light tanks, were expected to exploit their higher speed and longer range to operate far behind the front in order to cut lines of supply and communications.

== Background ==
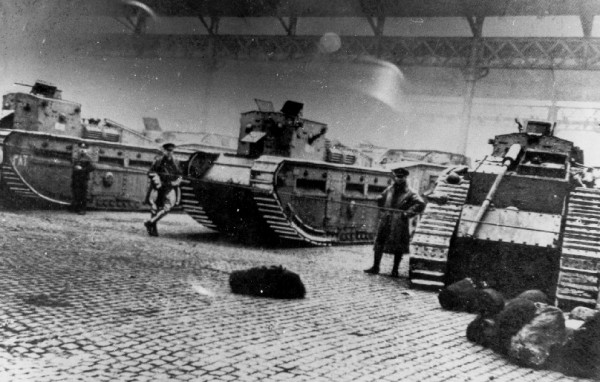
Medium Mark Cs

No one individual was responsible for the development of the tank. Rather, a number of gradual technological developments brought the development of the tank as we know it closer until its eventual form was unveiled out of necessity by the British Army. The British Army designs were forced by the trench warfare in which neither side could achieve more than small incremental gains without heavy loss of soldiers lives, but tanks changed that. They were made to cross the trenches and quickly break into the enemy rear, while other tanks supported the main attack. The development between the infantry tank and the cruiser tanks had its origins in the First World War division between the first British heavy tanks which supported the infantry and the faster Whippet Medium Mark A and its successors the Medium Mark B and Medium Mark C. During the interbellum British tank experiments generally followed these basic classifications, which were made part of the overall doctrine with the work of Percy Hobart and Captain B. H. Liddell Hart. The next development of the more heavily armoured and upgunned tanks was brought about by the tank on tank battles in the Second World War German Blitzkrieg. This continued throughout the war, and led to heavy tanks which became the basis of the current Main Battle Tanks seen throughout the armies today.

=== British development ===
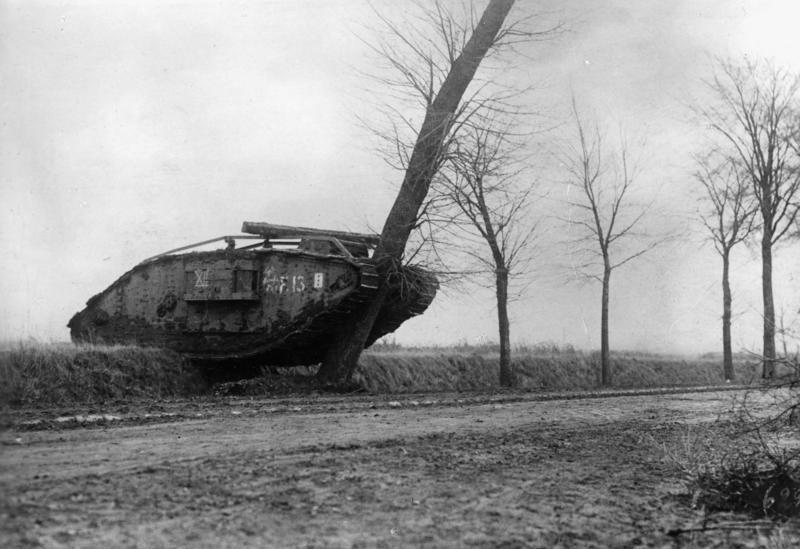
German photograph of British tank pushing over a tree

The Landship Committee commissioned Lieutenant Walter Gordon Wilson of the Royal Naval Air Service and William Tritton of William Foster & Co. of Lincoln, to produce a small landship. Constructed in great secrecy, the machine was given the code-name tank by Swinton.

The "Number 1 Lincoln Machine", nicknamed "Little Willie" weighed 14 tons and could carry a crew of three, at speeds of less than 2 mph over rough ground. Trench-crossing ability was deemed insufficient however, leading to the development of a rhomboidal design, which became known as "HMLS Centipede" and later "Mother", the first of the British heavy tanks. After completion on 29 January 1916 very successful trials were made, and an order was placed by the War Office for 100 units to be used on the Western Front in France, on 12 February 1916, and a second order for 50 additional units was placed in April 1916.

The great secrecy surrounding tank development, coupled with the skepticism of infantry commanders, often meant that infantry at first had little training to cooperate with tanks.

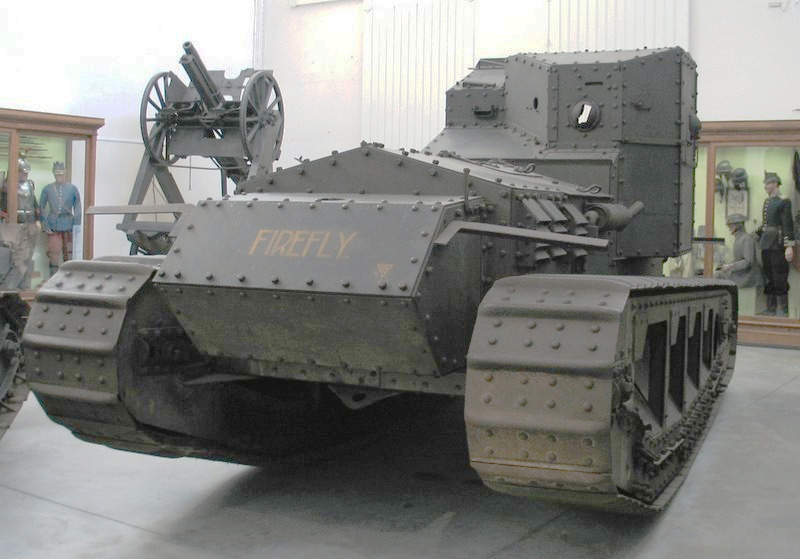
Medium Mk A "Whippet"

The first use of the British tanks on the battlefield was the use of 49 Mark I tanks during the Battle of the Somme on 15 September 1916, with mixed, but still impressive results. Many broke down but nearly a third succeeded in breaking through. Finally, in a preview of later developments, the British developed the lighter Whippet. This tank was specifically designed to exploit breaches in the enemy front. The Whippet was faster than most other tanks, although it carried only machinegun armament. Postwar tank designs would reflect this trend towards greater tactical mobility.

While the British took the lead in tank development, the French were not far behind and fielded their first tanks in 1917. The Germans, on the other hand, were slower to develop tanks, concentrating on anti-tank weapons.

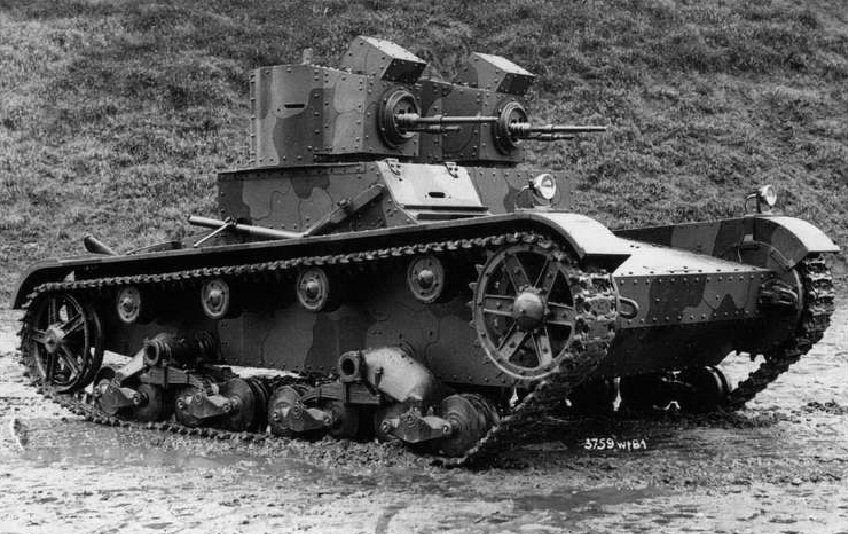
Vickers 6-Ton Tank

Following the Great War, many experiments involving armoured vehicles were conducted in the United Kingdom. Particularly many advances were made in the areas of suspensions, tracks, communications, and the organization of these vehicles on the battlefield. Britain continued its technical dominance of tank design from 1915 through to at least the early 1930s. British designs, particularly those from Vickers-Armstrong, formed the basis for many of the most common tanks of the 1930s and early WWII. The Vickers 6-Ton, which was arguably the most influential design of the late 1920s, was not adopted by the British Army.

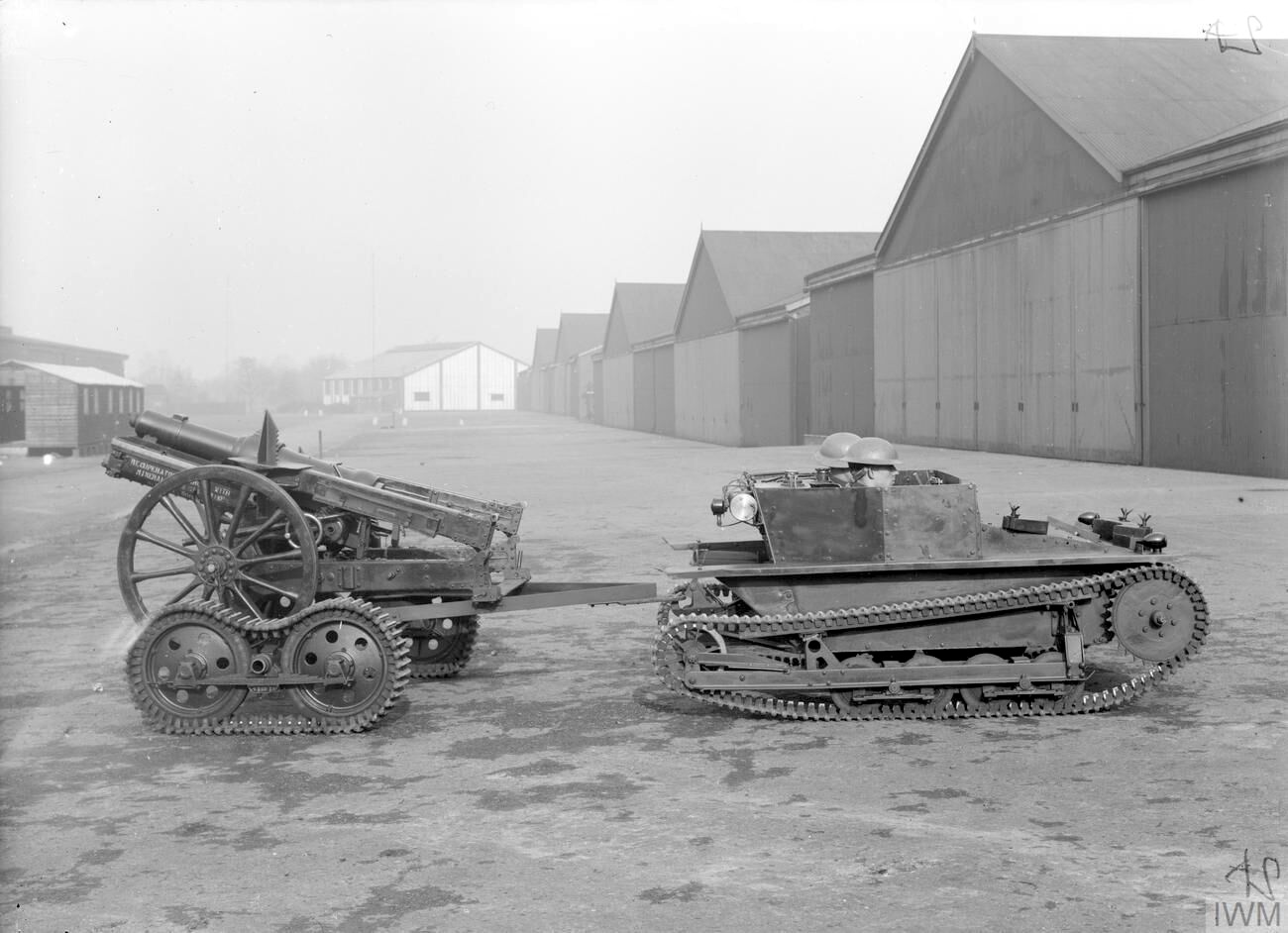
A Carden-Loyd tankette towing a howitzer in 1929

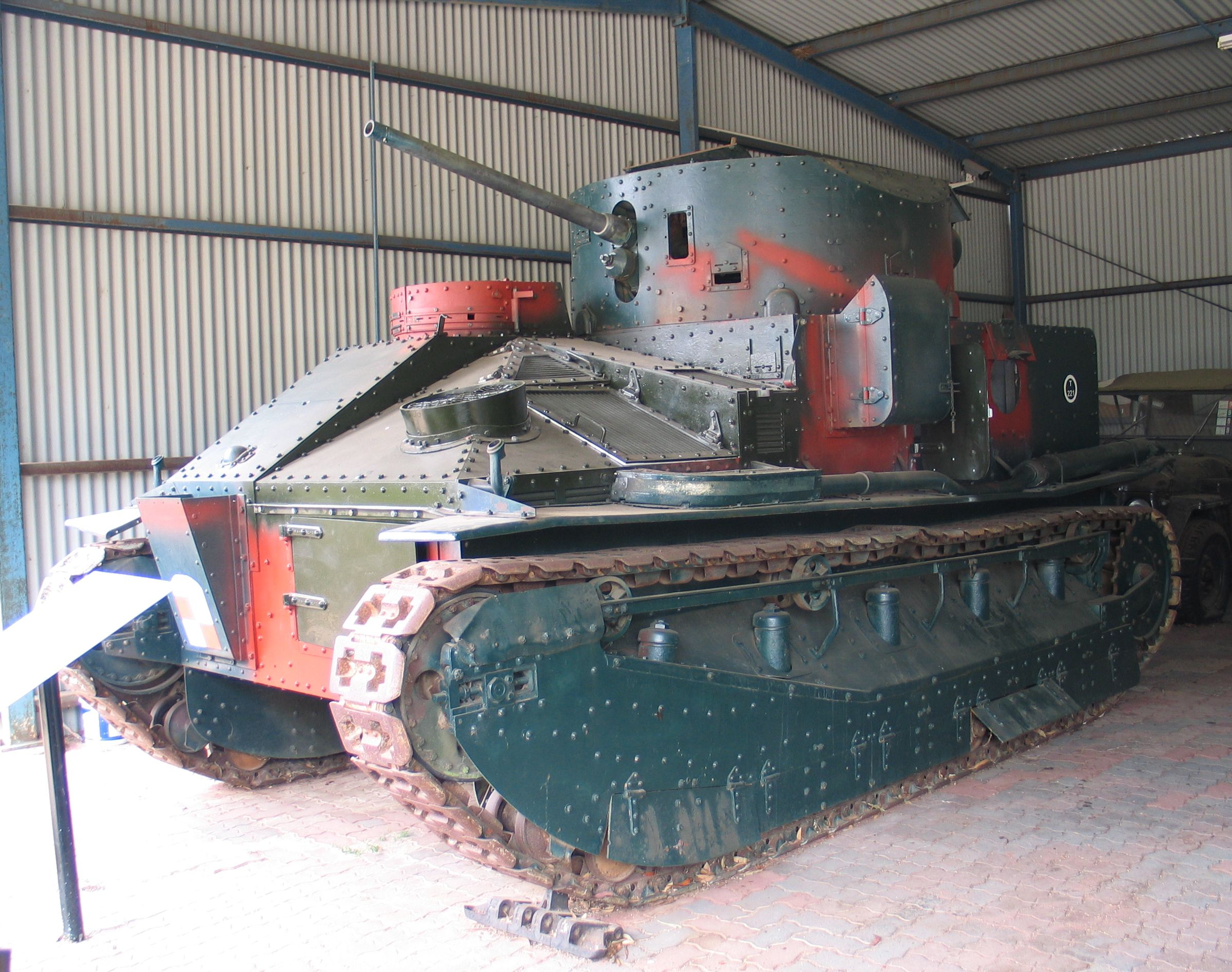
Vickers Medium Mark II tank

The Carden Loyd tankettes (two-man vehicles with machine guns) influenced the tankette concept through export and similar designs such as the Soviet T-27, Italian CV-33, German Panzer I and other copies. Another notable design was the Vickers Medium Mk II, a pivotal design which combined some of the best traits of WWI tanks into a much faster tank. Eventually, by the 1930s, British experiments and policy and their strategic situation led to a tank development programme with three main types of tank: light, cruiser, and infantry. The infantry tanks were intended to support dismounted infantry. The maximum speed requirement matched the walking pace of a rifleman, and the armour on these tanks was expected to be heavy enough to provide immunity to towed anti-tank guns. Armament had to be sufficient to suppress or destroy enemy machine gun positions and bunkers as well as enemy tanks. Cruiser tanks were to carry out the traditional cavalry roles of pursuit and exploitation, working relatively independently of the infantry. This led to cruiser tank designs requiring greater speed. To achieve this they were unable to carry as much armour as the infantry tanks, and tended to carry anti-tank armament. In practice both cruiser and infantry tanks entered the Second World War with the same gun. The light tanks were tasked with reconnaissance and constabulary-type colonial roles, with cost the major design factor.

An outstanding achievement of the British Army had been the creation of the Experimental Mechanised Force in the late 1920s. This was a small Brigade-sized unit developed to field-test the use of tanks and other vehicles. The unit pioneered the extensive use of radio to control widely separated small units. The unit was short-lived, however. However even though the British in the 1930s continued the design and development of tanks themselves, the Germans began to further develop tank strategy and incorporate them into their tactical employment more than the British. This doctrine of deployment led armies to equip their tanks with radios, to provide unmatched command and control, Germany along with the USSR also led the way with welding, although the US followed closely. Riveting and bolting remained in use in British designs.

Infantry tanks were a continuation of the Great War tanks, heavily armoured and designed to accompany an advancing infantry unit and hence slow. Once the infantry tanks had punched through an enemy line, lighter and faster cruiser tanks would be let loose to disrupt supply lines.

The main problem with this strategy however, was that the British infantry tanks were just too slow and the cruisers of the time were vulnerable, and often mechanically unreliable. Come 1940, most of the British armour had been abandoned in France when the British Expeditionary Force was evacuated from Dunkirk, but this encouraged new designs. By the end of the war the increase in speed of the infantry tanks, and the increased armour of the cruisers, meant that there was little difference between the two classes of British tank. However, the British had to quickly build more reliable and more heavily armoured designs from the experienced gained in the early battles or acquire US designs to meet the needs.

At the start of the war most British tanks were equipped with the Ordnance QF 2-pounder (40mm) gun which was able to penetrate contemporary German armour. The trend towards bigger guns and thicker armour which resulted in heavier tanks, made itself felt as the Second World War progressed, and some tanks began to show weaknesses in design.

In 1939, most tanks had maximum armour of 30 mm or less, with guns no heavier than 37–47 mm. Medium tanks of 1939 weighed around 20 tons. Also if the tank's gun was to be used to engage both unarmoured and armoured targets, then it needed to be as large and powerful as possible, making one large gun with an all-round field of fire vital. Also, mounting the gun in a turret ensured that the tank could fire from behind some cover. Hull-mounted guns required that most of the vehicle be exposed to enemy fire. Multiple-turreted or multi-gun designs such as the British A9 Cruiser Mk I slowly became less common.

British tanks armament and use in the battles also had to change as German Blitzkrieg tactics and doctrine shifted towards faster medium and heavy tanks fighting large multi-tank battles, with the role of the infantry tank in assaults taken by simpler self-propelled artillery. In British practice, the main armament of the infantry tank went in three phases. The pre-Dunkirk British Army Matilda I infantry tank had only a single Vickers machine gun, a compromise forced by the low cost to which they had been built. The Matilda II had a capable anti-tank gun with the 40mm 2 pounder but these were only issued with solid-shot AP shell(Armour piercing) (i.e. non-explosive) for anti-tank use and was of little use for artillery close-support of infantry. The follow-up gun to the 2pdr was already in development but the need to rapidly replace the losses in France delayed its production. Eventually QF 6-pounder (57mm) guns were put into the British tanks, and these could deal with pretty much anything but head on attacks on the German Tiger and Panther tanks - thanks to their special armour piercing rounds. As the war progressed many British tanks were equipped with a gun firing the same 75mm ammunition as American Sherman tanks. These had better performance using high explosive or smoke ammunition, but could not match the 6-pounder against armour. Then the 17-pounder (76.2 mm) was developed, becoming the best British gun of the war - able to deal with almost any armour put up against it.

== Operational use ==
=== First World War ===
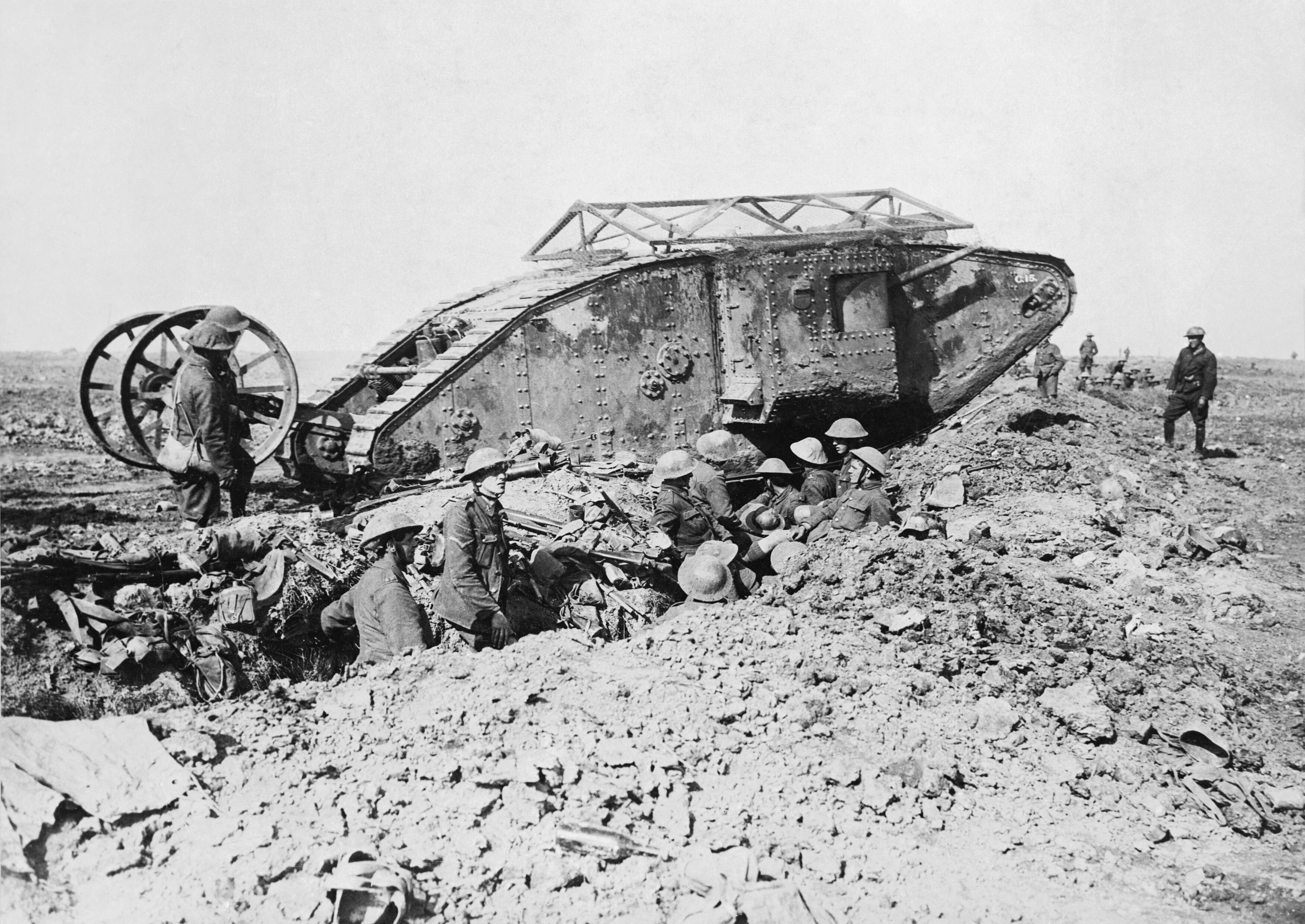
A British Mark I tank in action on 26 September 1916 (moving left to right). Photo by Ernest Brooks.

The British Mark I was the world's first combat tank, entering service in August 1916, and first used in action on the morning of 15 September 1916. It was developed to be able to cross trenches, resist small-arms fire, travel over difficult terrain, carry supplies, and be able to capture fortified enemy positions. The Mark I was a development of Little Willie, the experimental tank built for the Landships Committee by Lieutenant Walter Wilson and William Tritton in the summer of 1915. A small number of Mark I tanks took part in the battle of the Somme during the Battle of Flers-Courcelette in September 1916. They were used to cut through barbed wire to clear the way for infantry, and were even driven through houses to destroy machine gunner's emplacements. Although many broke down or became stuck, almost a third that attacked made it across no man's land, and their effect on the enemy was noted, leading to a request by the British C-in-C Douglas Haig for a thousand more. The Mark II and Mark III incorporated minor improvements and changes over the Mark I with the Mark II used in the Battle of Arras in April 1917 because of delays in the production of the Mark I tank. The Mk IV incorporated thicker armour to resist German armour-piercing bullets. The Mark V had more power (150 bhp) and could be steered by one man, thanks to the epicyclic gear system created by Walter Wilson. It was first used in the Battle of Hamel on 4 July 1918 when 60 tanks contributed to a successful assault by Australian units on the German lines. During the Battle of Amiens in August 1918, several hundred of the Mark V and the lengthened Mk V* tanks, together with the new Whippet tanks, penetrated the German lines in a foretaste of modern armoured warfare.

The Mark VI did not progress past the stage of a wooden mock-up; the project was cancelled in December 1917 in order that a tank co-developed with the US (the Mark VIII) could go forward. Because of technical troubles the Mark VII, almost identical to Mks I to V, had only three produced out of an order for 74 when war ended. The Mark VIII was a cooperative design between the Allies and was also known as "Liberty," "International," or Anglo-American tank. It did not see combat in the war but was used and upgraded until the 1930s when given to Canada for training. The Mark IX was designed in 1917 as the world's first specialised Armoured Personnel Carrier (APC). Thirty-four were completed, but none saw service. One was experimentally equipped as an armoured ambulance, and another rebuilt as an amphibious tank by the staff of the test base at Dollis Hill. There is photographic evidence that some Mk IX were used post-WWI as Infantry Carriers, but no record of their peacetime service is known to exist. The Mark X, a further improvement on the Mk V, was planned but never built. The Medium Mark A Whippet was a British tank of the First World War. It was intended to complement the slower British heavy tanks by using its relative mobility and speed in exploiting any break in the enemy lines. The Whippet tanks arrived late in the First World War, and went into action in March 1918. Alongside Mark V and V* tanks, they took part in the Amiens offensive (8 August 1918) where they broke through into the German rear areas causing the loss of the artillery in an entire front sector.

A first offensive using 49 Mark I tanks took place on 15 September 1916, during the Battle of the Somme, under Field Marshal Sir Douglas Haig, with limited success. Not until 20 November 1917, at Cambrai, did the British Tank Corps get the conditions it needed for success. Around 400 tanks penetrated almost six miles on a 7-mile front. This was their first large-scale deployment in combat. Unfortunately, success was not complete because the infantry failed to exploit and secure the tanks' gains. The British scored another victory the following year, on 8 August 1918, with 600 tanks in the Amiens salient. General Erich Ludendorff referred to that date as the "Black Day" of the German Army.

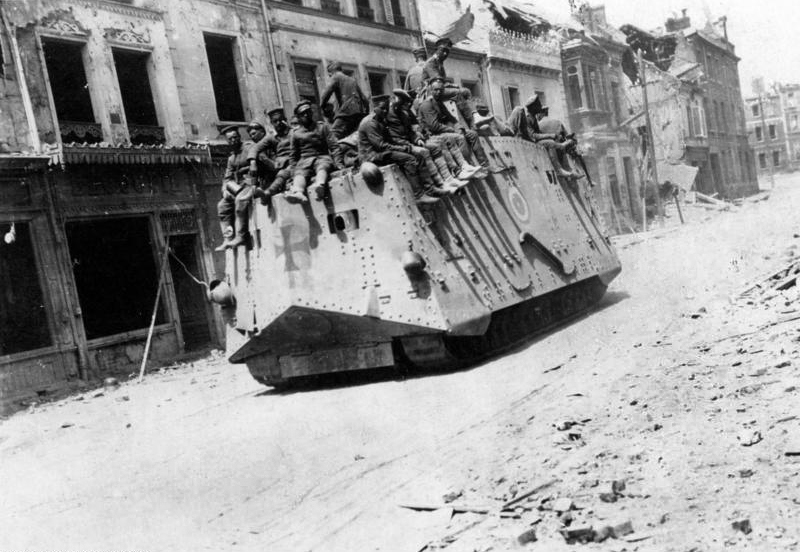
A7V tank at Roye on March 21, 1918

The German response to the Cambrai assault was to develop its own armoured program. Soon the massive A7V appeared. The A7V was a clumsy monster, weighing 30 tons with a crew of eighteen. By the end of the war, only twenty had been built. Although other tanks were on the drawing board, material shortages limited the German tank corps to these A7Vs and some captured Mark IVs. The A7V would be involved in the first tank vs. tank battle of the war on 24 April 1918 at Villers-Bretonneux—a battle in which there was no clear winner.

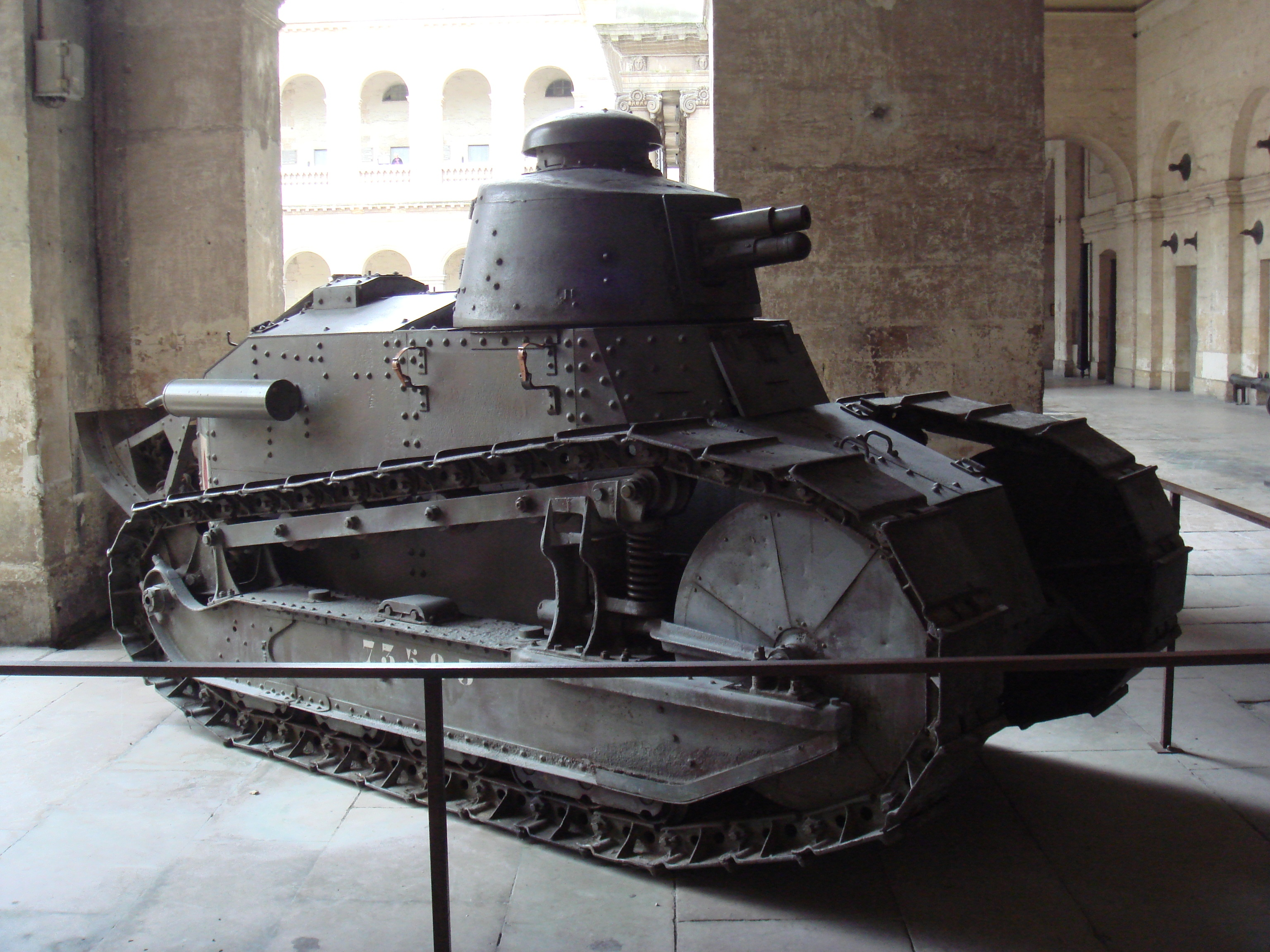
Char Renault FT, Les Invalides

Parallel to the British development, France designed its own tanks. The first two, the medium Schneider CA and heavy Saint-Chamond, were not well-conceived, though produced in large numbers and showing technical innovations, as for the latter type a petro-electrical transmission and a long 75 mm gun. The later Renault FT was the first operational tank with a "modern" configuration: a revolving turret on top and an engine compartment in the back; it would be the most numerous tank of the war. A last development was the superheavy Char 2C, the largest tank ever built, be it some years after the armistice.

WWI-era French and British tanks

Numerous mechanical failures and the inability of the British and French to mount any sustained drives in the early tank actions cast doubt on their usefulness—and by 1918, tanks were extremely vulnerable unless accompanied by infantry and ground-attack aircraft, both of which worked to locate and suppress anti-tank defenses.

The first American-produced heavy tank was the 43.5-ton Mark VIII, a US-British development of the successful British heavy tank design. Armed with two 6-pounder cannon and five .30-caliber machine guns, it was operated by an 11-man crew, had a maximum speed of 6.5 miles per hour, and a range of 50 miles. Production difficulties meant that none was produced before the War ended.

=== Between the wars ===
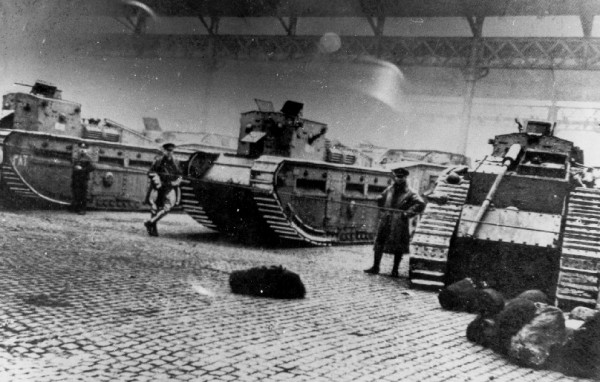
Medium Mark Cs tanks, an improvement from the Whippet

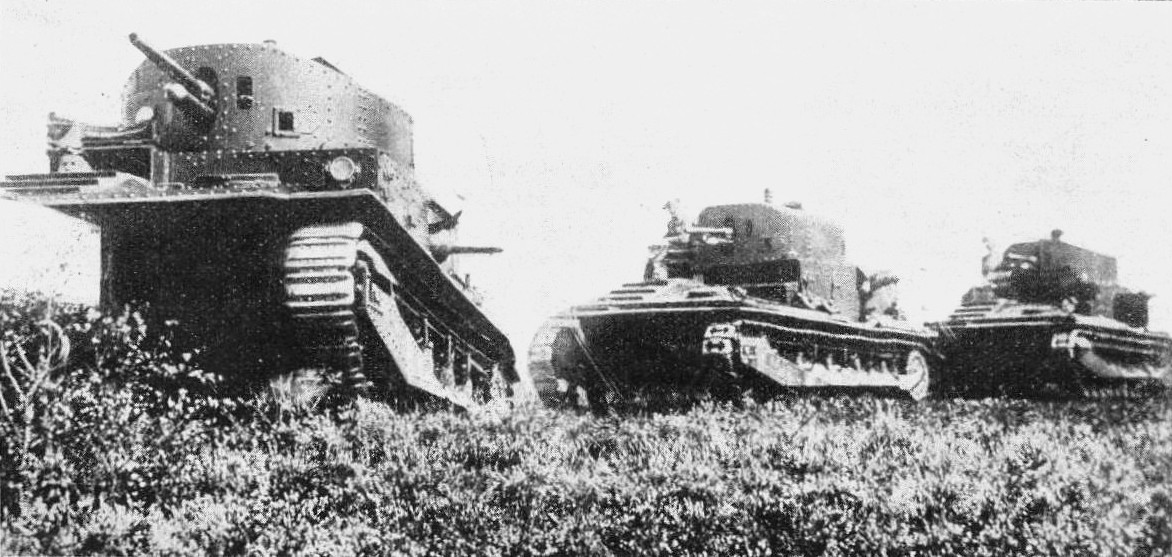
Vickers Medium Mark Is on a manoeuvre somewhere in England, 1930

After the Great War, General Erich Ludendorff of OHL, the German High Command, praised the Allied tanks as being a principal factor in Germany's defeat. The Germans had been too late in recognizing their value to consider them in their own plans.

At a time when most soldiers regarded the tank as a specialised infantry-support weapon for crossing trenches, officers in the Royal Tank Corps had gone on to envision much broader roles for mechanized organizations. In May 1918, Colonel J.F.C. Fuller, the acknowledged father of tank doctrine, had used the example of German infiltration tactics to refine what he called "Plan 1919". This was an elaborate concept for a mass armoured offensive in 1919.

An outstanding achievement of the British Army was the creation of the Experimental Mechanised Force (EMF) in the late 1920s. This was a small brigade-sized unit developed to field-test the use of tanks and other vehicles. The EMF formed by the British demonstrated a mobile force with its own motorised infantry and self-propelled guns. The unit pioneered the extensive use of radio to control widely separated small units. The unit was short-lived.

In 1920 the Infantry had plans to acquire a Light Infantry Tank. Colonel Johnson of the Tank Design Department derived such a type from the Medium Mark D. In competition Vickers built the Vickers Light Tank. but the project was abandoned in 1922 in favour of a more conventional design: the Vickers Light Tank Mark I, that would be renamed to Vickers Medium Tank Mark I in 1924. The first prototypes were sent to Bovington for trials in 1923. The Medium Mark I replaced some of the Mark V heavy tanks and served in the Royal Tank Regiment, being the first type of in total 200 tanks to be retired in 1938. The Medium Mark I was the first tank to see "mass" production since the last of the ten Char 2C's had been finished in 1921. As of the next tank, the Renault NC27, only about thirty were built, the British Mediums represented most of the world tank production during the Twenties.

The Medium Mark I successor, the Vickers Medium Mk II The vickers medium mk ll was a direct evolution of the mk l it was introduced in 1925 and it shared the same chassis, engine and transmission of the previous mk 1 and combined some of the best traits of Great War tanks into a much faster tank. It was derived from the Vickers Medium Mark I and was developed to replace the last of the Medium Mark Cs still in use. It had a rotating turret on top like the FT but mounted a dual-purpose 3-pounder gun (that could fire both high-explosive and anti-tank shells) with a coaxial machine gun.

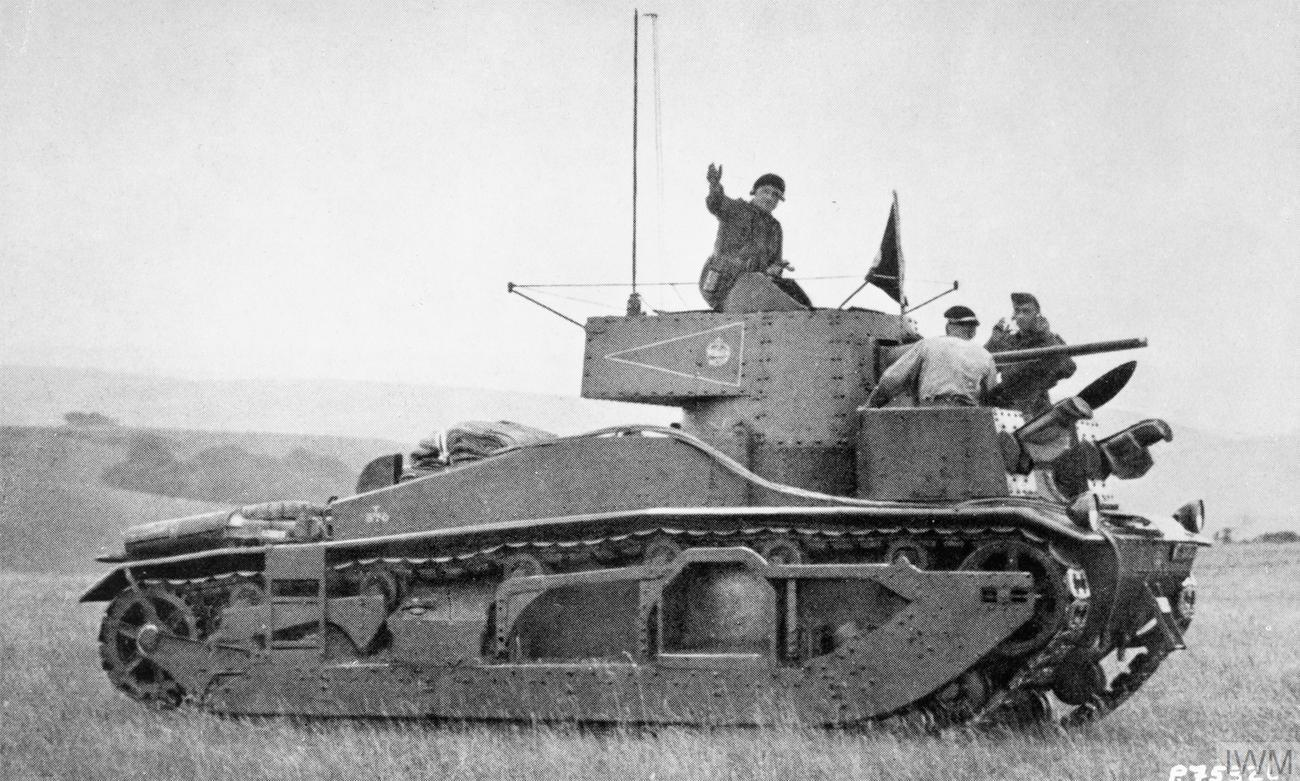
The Medium Mk III in use as a command vehicle

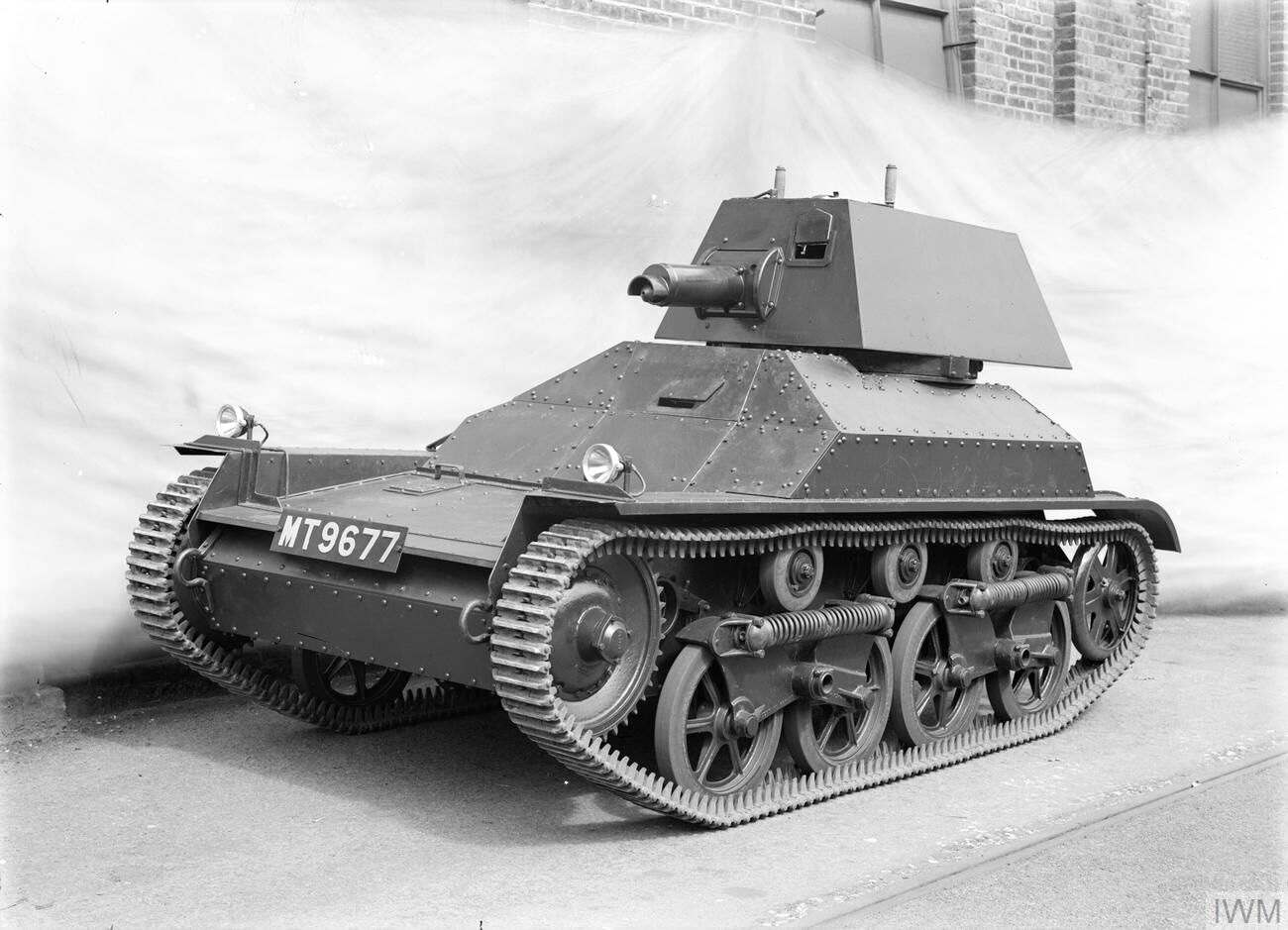
Light Tank Mk II

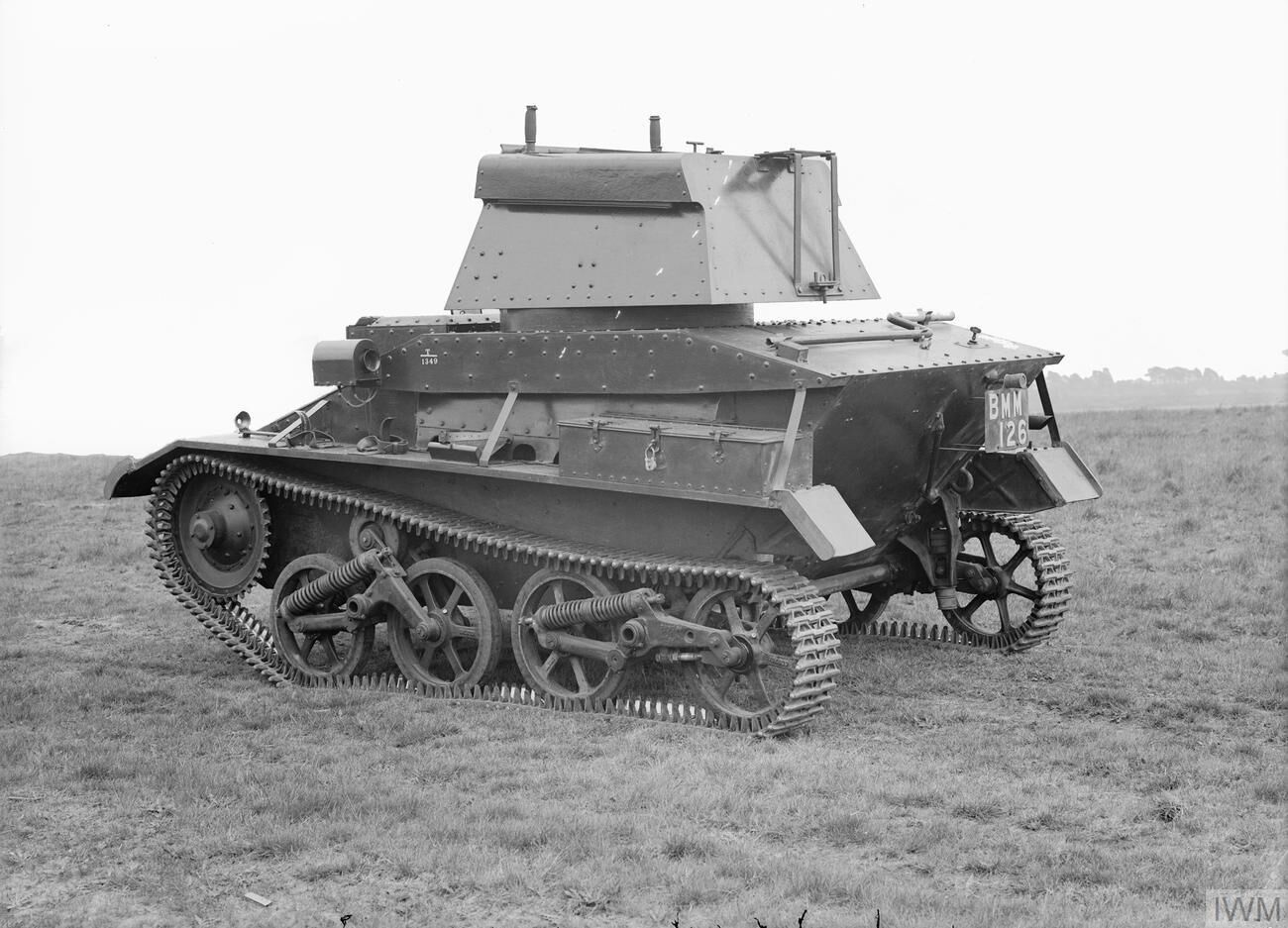
Light Tank Mk IV

The Medium Mark III was ordered in 1928 and proved reliable and a good gun platform. It suffered from a poorly-designed suspension, road speed increased to 30 mph (48 km/h) but during cross-country rides the bogies were often overloaded. Three Mark IIIs were built, one by Vickers and two by the Royal Ordnance Factory at Woolwich: Medium III E1, E2 and E3. The third had an improved suspension and the vehicles were in 1934 taken into use by the HQ of the Tank Brigade. One of the Mark IIIs was fitted as a command vehicle with an extra radio aerial around the turret. This was used by Brigadier Percy Hobart for the Salisbury Plain exercises during 1934.

The cavalry and the Royal Tank Corps wanted fast, lightly armoured, mobile vehicles for reconnaissance and raiding—the light and medium (or "cruiser") tanks. In practice the "light tanks" were often small armoured personnel carriers. Army Tank Battalions for infantry-support required thickly armoured tanks. As a consequence of this doctrinal split, firepower was neglected in tank design.

After the First World War, the British began to produce a series of similar light tanks and developed them right up to the Second World War; the Light Tanks Mk II through to the Mk V. Eventually, by the 1930s, British experiments and their strategic situation led to a tank development programme with three main types of tank: light, cruiser and infantry. The Infantry tanks were for the support of infantry. The maximum speed requirement matched the walking pace of a rifleman and the armour on these tanks was expected to be thick enough to provide immunity against towed anti-tank guns. Armament had to be sufficient to suppress or destroy enemy machine gun positions and bunkers. Cruiser tanks gained the traditional cavalry roles of pursuit and exploitation, working relatively independently of the infantry. This led to cruiser tank designs having great speed. To achieve this they were lightly armoured and tended to carry anti-tank armament.

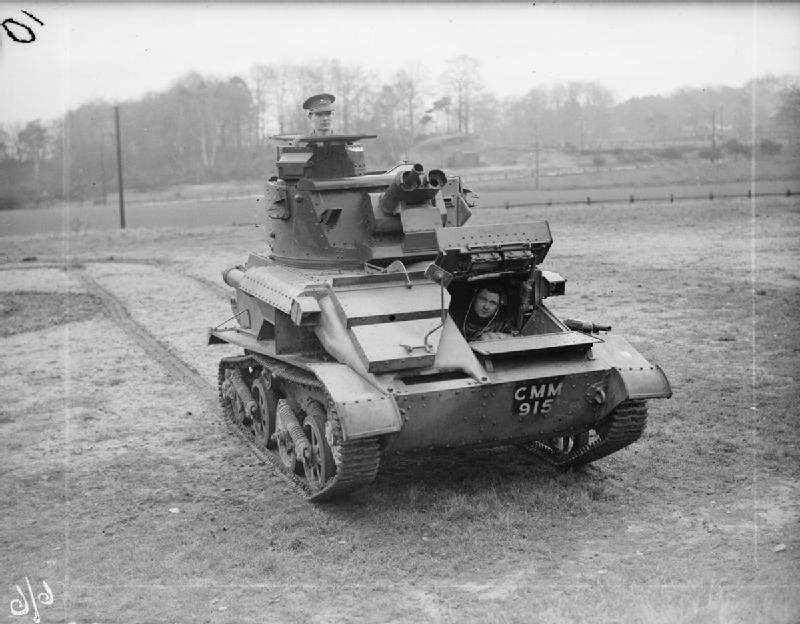
Light Tank Mk.VIA of the 3rd King's Own Hussars

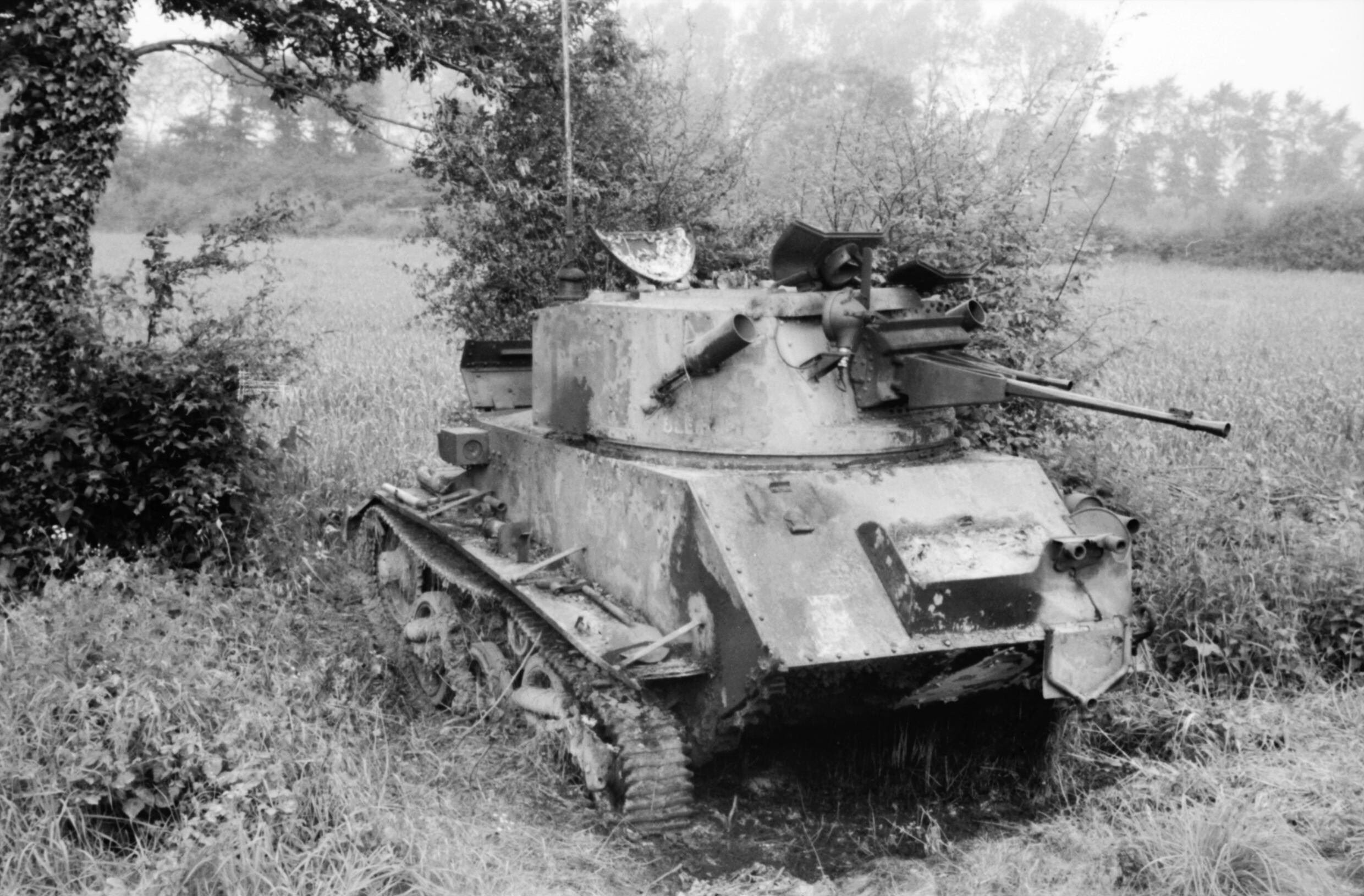
Vickers Light Tank Mk VIC knocked out during an engagement on 27 May 1940 in the Somme sector

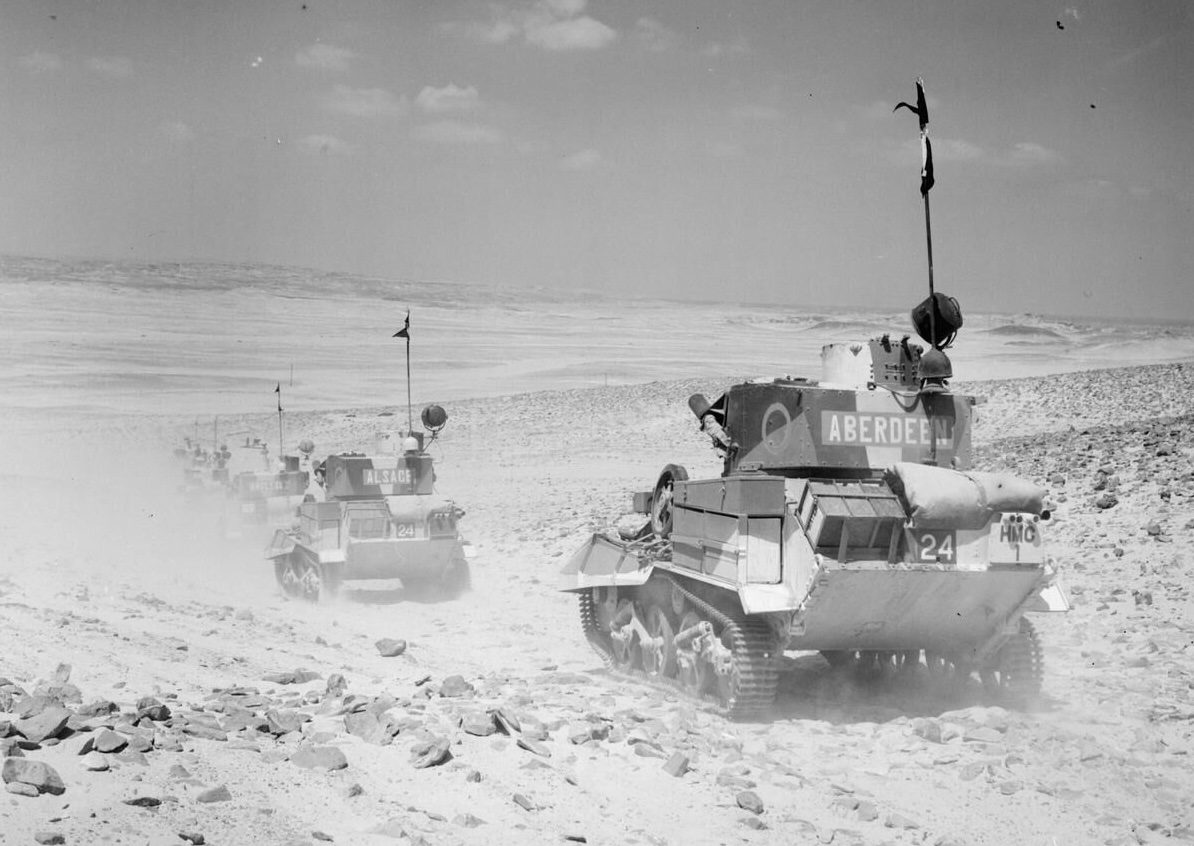
British Vickers light tanks cross the desert, 1940

The light tanks were for reconnaissance and colonial policing, with cheapness the major design factor. They were not expected to fight anything other than other light tanks nor need a gun for fighting heavier tanks. They saw use in training and in limited engagements with British Empire units such as the South African Army during the East African Campaign against forces of the Italian Empire. Up until the Mk V, they had a driver–commander and a gunner. The Mk V had a driver, gunner and the commander helping on the gun. The light tanks were kept in use for training until around 1942. Some saw use in the Western Desert Campaign or Abyssinia. They were followed by the Light Tank Mk VI from 1936.

The Light Tank Mk VI was the sixth and final design in the line of tanks built by Vickers-Armstrongs for the British Army during the interwar period. The company had achieved a degree of standardization with their earlier five models and the Mark VI was identical in all but a few respects. Production of the Mk VI began in 1936 and ended in 1940 with approximately 1,000 Mark VI tanks built.

When the Mk VI was first produced in 1936, the Imperial General Staff considered the tank to be superior to any light tank produced by other nations, and well suited to the dual roles of reconnaissance and colonial warfare. Like many of its predecessors, the Mark VI was used by the British Army for imperial policing duties in British India and other colonies in the British Empire, a role for which it and the other Vickers-Armstrongs light tanks were found to be well suited. When the British government began rearming in the 1930s, the Mk VI was the only tank with which the War Office was ready to proceed with manufacture, the development of a medium tank for the Army had hit severe problems after the cancellation of the proposed "Sixteen Tonner" medium tank in 1932 due to the cost and cheaper models only existed as prototypes with a number of mechanical problems. When the Second World War began in September 1939, the vast majority of the tanks available to the British Army were Mk VIs - there were 1,002 Mk VI Light Tanks. The British and Commonwealth forces employed a relatively small number of these light tanks and armoured vehicles in East Africa against the forces of the Italian Empire from June 1940 to November 1941. For the most part, an assortment of armoured cars was used. B Squadron 4th Royal Tank Regiment did include small number of Matilda II infantry tanks.

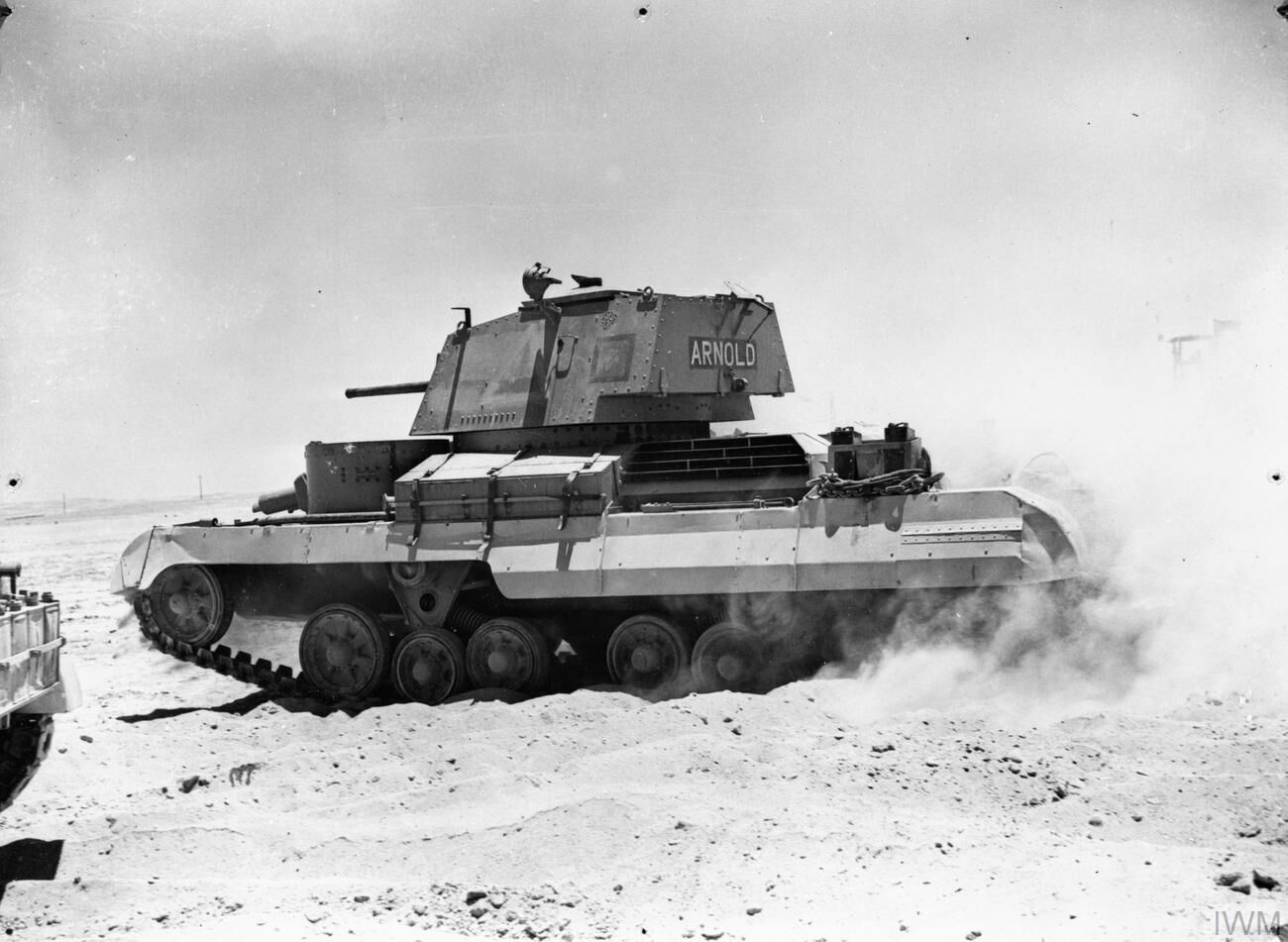
Cruiser Mk I (A9)

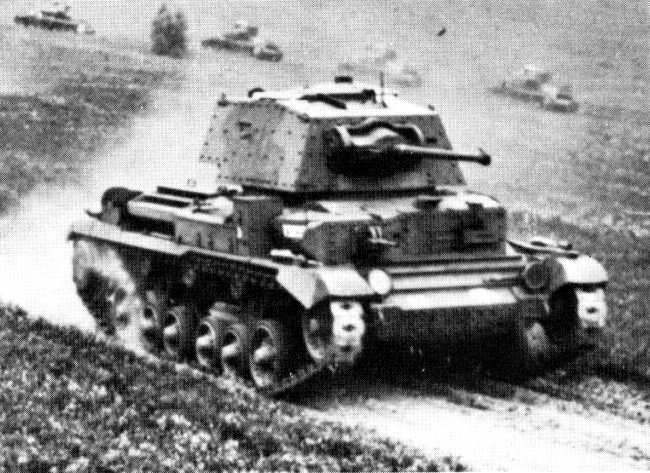
Cruiser Mk II (A10)

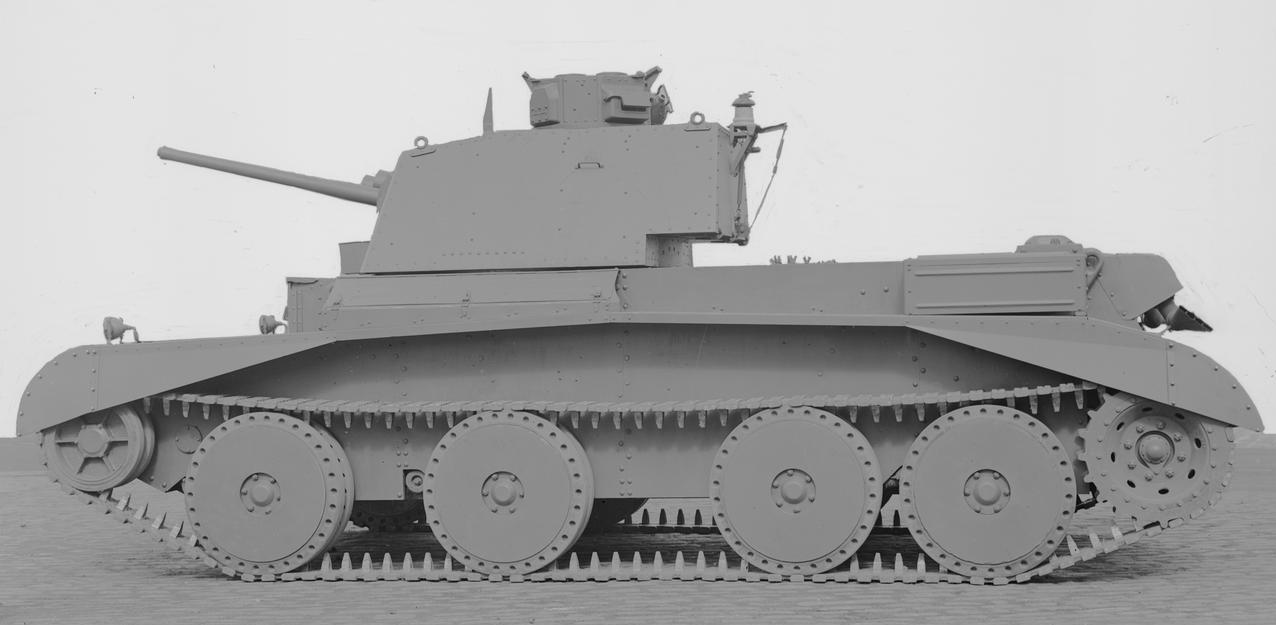
A Cruiser Mk III (A13)

In 1934 the best features of the earlier Mk III light tank were incorporated into a cruiser tank design. Sir John Carden of Vickers-Armstrong produced this new tank, to General Staff specification A9, which was subsequently accepted as the Cruiser Mk I (A9). A prototype was tested in 1936 and it went into production the following year, 125 examples being produced in 1937 and 1938. The follow-up to the A9, the Cruiser Mk II (A10), was also designed by Carden. Designated as a "heavy cruiser" tank, it was put into production in July 1938. It resembled the Cruiser Mk I but had thicker armour and was one of the first British tanks with Spaced armour and the first to be equipped with the Besa machine gun.

Orders for the cruisers Mk I and Mk II were restricted, since the British Army had already decided to produce a more advanced and faster cruiser tank which would incorporate the Christie suspension acquired from the American inventor J. Walter Christie and have better armour. In 1936, Giffard LeQuesne Martel, a pioneer in tank design who had published works on armoured warfare and pioneered the lightly armoured "tankette" to enhance infantry mobility, became Assistant Director of Mechanization at the War Office. Earlier that year Martel had witnessed demonstrations of Soviet tank designs including the BT tank, which had been influenced by Christie's work. He urged the adoption of a tank that would use the suspension system and also follow Christie's practice of using a lightweight aircraft engine such as the Liberty Engine. The government authorized purchase and licensing of a Christie design via the newly formed Nuffield Mechanisation and Aero.

The vehicle obtained from Christie became the basis of the Cruiser Mk III (A13 Mk 1) though Christie's tank required extensive redesign as it was too small. Following testing of two prototypes, the A13 was ordered into production and 65 were manufactured. The Mk III weighed 14 long tons (14 t), had a crew of four, a 340 hp engine which gave a top speed of 30 mph (48 km/h) and was armed with a Ordnance QF 2 pounder gun and a machine gun. When it was introduced into service in 1937, the Army still lacked a formal tank division. The Cruiser Mk IV (A13 Mk II) was a more heavily armoured version of the Mk III and was used in some of the early campaigns of the war.

== Second World War ==
=== Fall of France ===
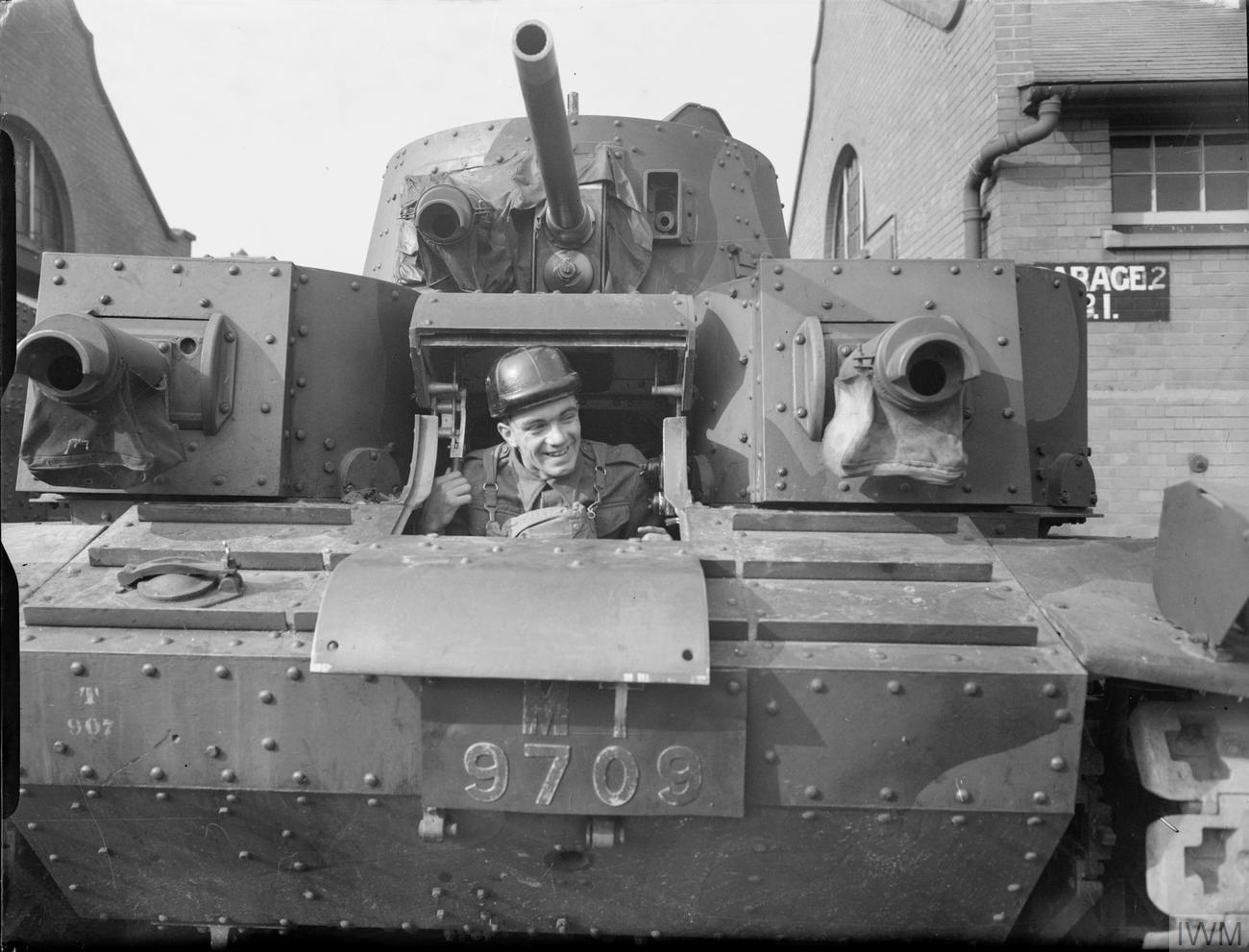
The trainee driver of a Medium Tank MkIII in 1940

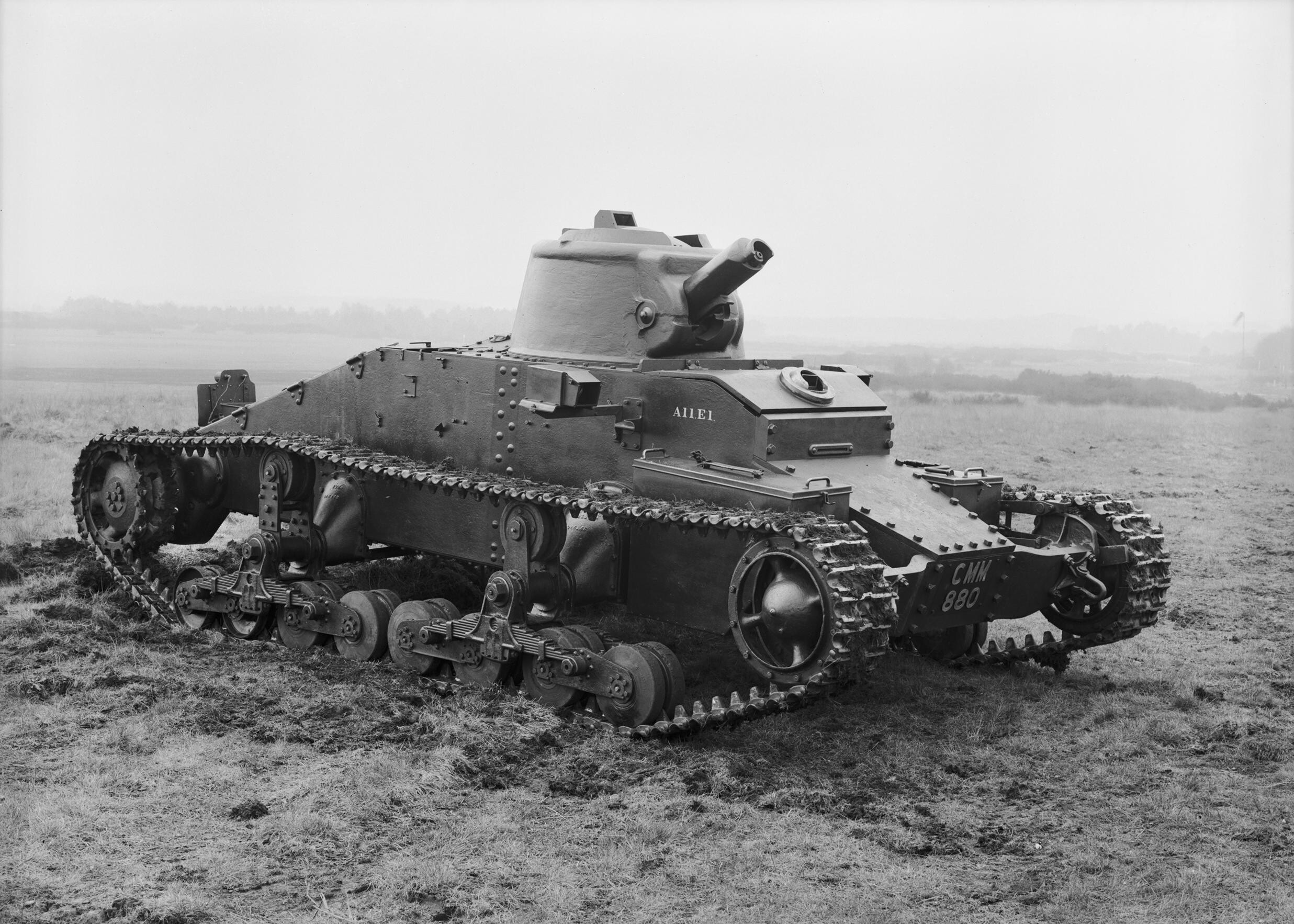
British Matilda I tank

By the time the Second World War had come around, the design of the tank had shifted from its uses as a terrain covering vehicle, and the full potential of the tank as an armoured, combat vehicle had been realised.

Since the infantry tanks were to work at the pace of the infantry units, which would be attacking on foot, high speed was not a requirement and they were able to carry heavier armour. The Infantry Tank came about as a result of a 1934 requirement by the General Staff for a tank that would directly support an infantry attack. Armament would consist of a machine gun and an overall speed of a walking man when moving. Vickers designed an inexpensive (cost was a serious consideration) pilot which was delivered and accepted in 1936. Although heavily armoured it was slow and under-armed. Most would be lost or left behind in France.

The first purpose-designed infantry tanks were the Matilda I armed with a machine-gun and Matilda II, which was armed with a machine gun and a QF 2 pounder anti-tank gun. It was quickly seen that the Matilda I, with only a machine gun, was inadequate for its intended role. The second Matilda was ordered directly off the drawing board in 1937. During its production years of 1940 to 1943, 2,987 of these sturdy tanks were built. Though small, the tank presented a massive appearance due to its armoured skirts and cast armour. The Matilda 2 totally dominated all Italian armour and could claim title to "Queen of the Desert" until the arrival of German tanks in North Africa.

The British Army were pioneers in tank combat but by 1939 it could be argued they were behind the times in terms of strategy and tactics, their methods based on the trench warfare of the First World War. The British Army entered the Second World War with an array of poor designs and hobbled by poor doctrine. According to the theories of Captain BH Liddell Hart and Major-General Sir Percy Hobart, they split their tank force into two groups; Infantry tanks and Cruiser tanks. British tank use focused on cavalry-type missions and infantry support without the focus on the combined-arms tactics that dominated German and later Soviet thinking.

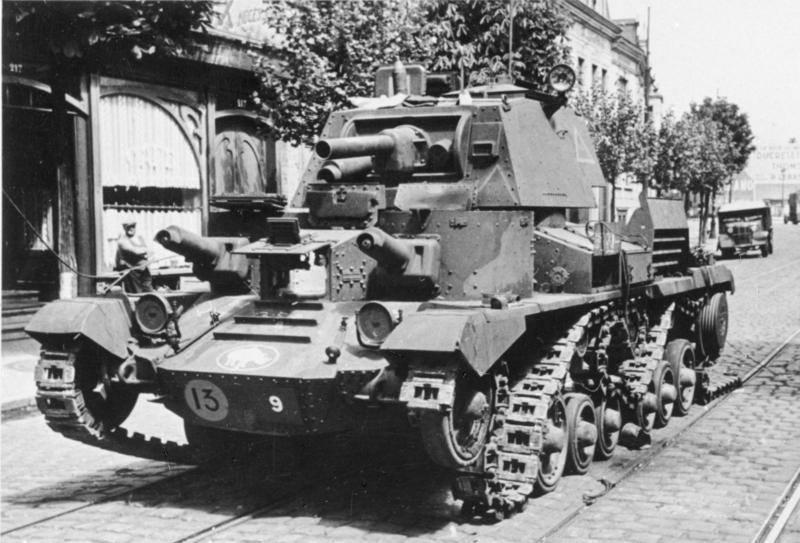
A damaged Cruiser Mk I CS abandoned in Calais, 1940

The result was a series of designs such as the A9 which Sir John Carden of Vickers-Armstrong produced in 1934 and A10 and Crusader (A15) cruiser tanks, and the Matilda (A11) also by Vickers-Armstrongs Ltd, began in 1935 and Matilda II (A12) infantry tanks, and a series of light tanks, the Light Tank Mk I built earlier by Vickers Armstrong from 1929, up to the Light Tank Mk V produced during 1936, that were suitable for reconnaissance work only.

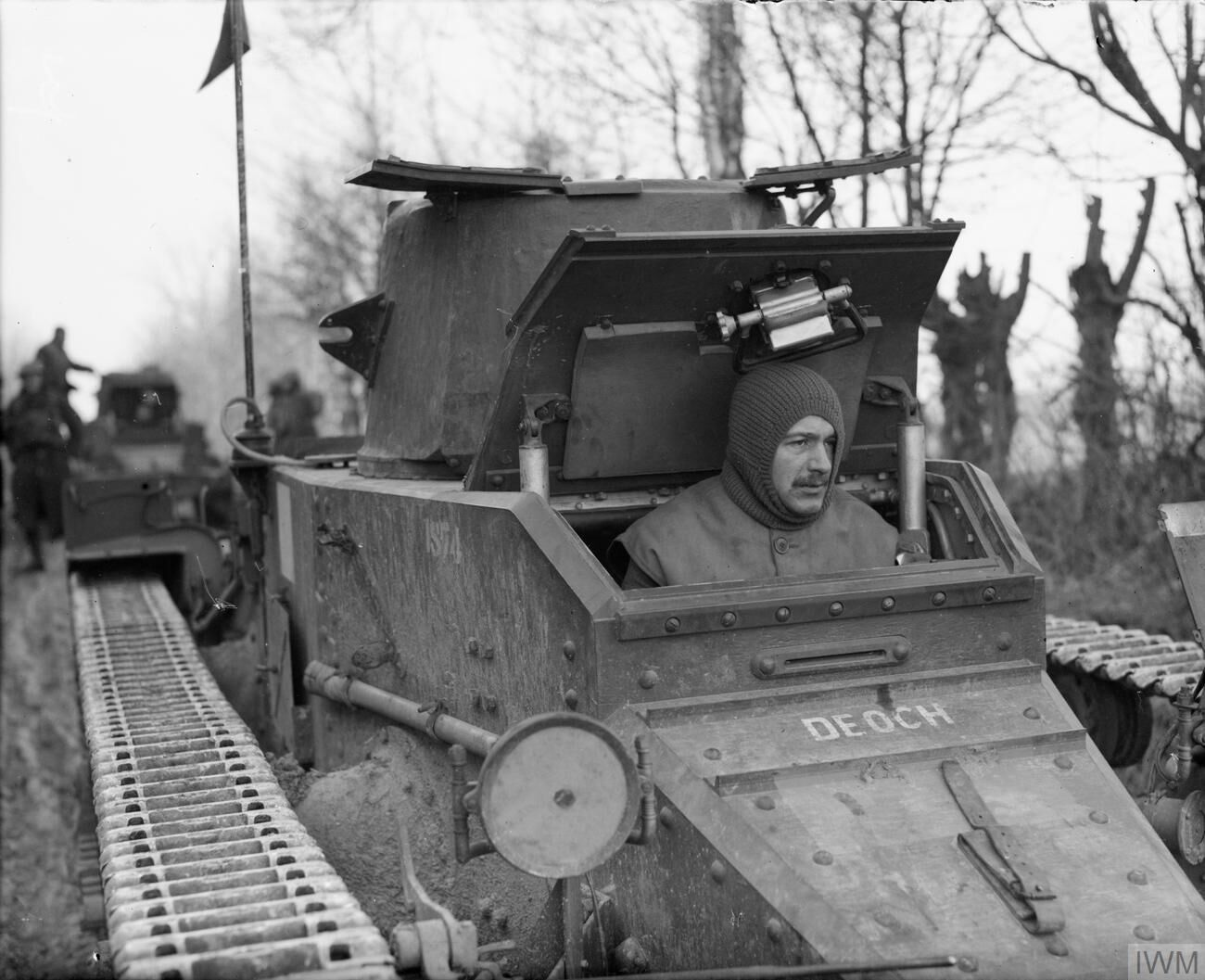
The driver of a Matilda I in France during the winter of 1939–40. This shows the cramped driver's compartment and how the hatch obstructs the gun turret

The Matilda Mk I, (A11) and Matilda II (A12) infantry tanks fought together in France as part of the 1st Army Tank Brigade of the British Expeditionary Force in the Battle of France. They participated in the defence and counter-attack operation at Arras against the invasion by Nazi Germany in May 1940, temporarily discomfiting the 7th Panzer Division under Rommel. In the battle, elements of motorized SS regiment "Totenkopf" (later to be expanded into SS-Division Totenkopf)—were overrun, their standard 37 mm (1.46 in) PaK 36/37 anti-tank guns proving ineffective against the heavily armoured British Matilda tank. Rommel committed some of his armour to local counterattacks, only to find the guns of the Panzer II and Panzer 38(t) tanks could not penetrate the Matildas' armour. Desperate to prevent a British breakthrough, Rommel ordered the division's 88 mm (3.46 in) FlaK 18 anti-aircraft guns and 105 mm (4.1 in) field guns be formed into a defensive line and fire anti-tank and HE rounds in a last-ditch effort to stop the Matildas, and this stopped the British tanks. The attack made the German commanders nervous, and the battle is historically credited with shaking the confidence of the German High Command (OKW) and it may have been one of the factors for the surprise German halt on 24 May that gave the BEF the slimmest of opportunities to begin evacuation from Dunkirk. The main British force consisted of only 58 machine gun armed Matilda Is and 16 QF 2-pounder gun armed Matilda IIs supported by a few lighter armoured vehicles.

== Secondary Campaigns ==
The Mk I (A9) cruiser was used in the French, Greek and early North African campaigns. Sixty British Cruiser Mk II's went to Greece with the 3rd Royal Tank Regiment and fought against the German tanks, but over 90% suffered mechanical breakdowns as opposed to enemy action. The Cruiser Mk III saw action in Greece and early North African campaigns where they equipped units of the 7th Armoured Division. The Cruiser Mk IV tank saw action in the French and early North African campaigns.

The Cruiser tank Mk V Covenanter was first cruiser tank design to be given a name, and never deployed outside the British Isles. They first were used to re-equip the British 1st Armoured Division after the Fall of France.

The Crusader tanks became the main British tank, the A15 Crusader Mark I and II variants had QF 2 pounder (40mm) main gun, but the 'Crusader III' was fitted with an Ordnance QF 6 pounder (57mm) main gun. It used the same main turret as the A13 Mk III Covenanter designs, and over 5,000 tanks were manufactured. The A15 Crusader Mark III and Mark IV finally replaced most tanks in the British forces after the fall of France and was used extensively during the North African Campaign.

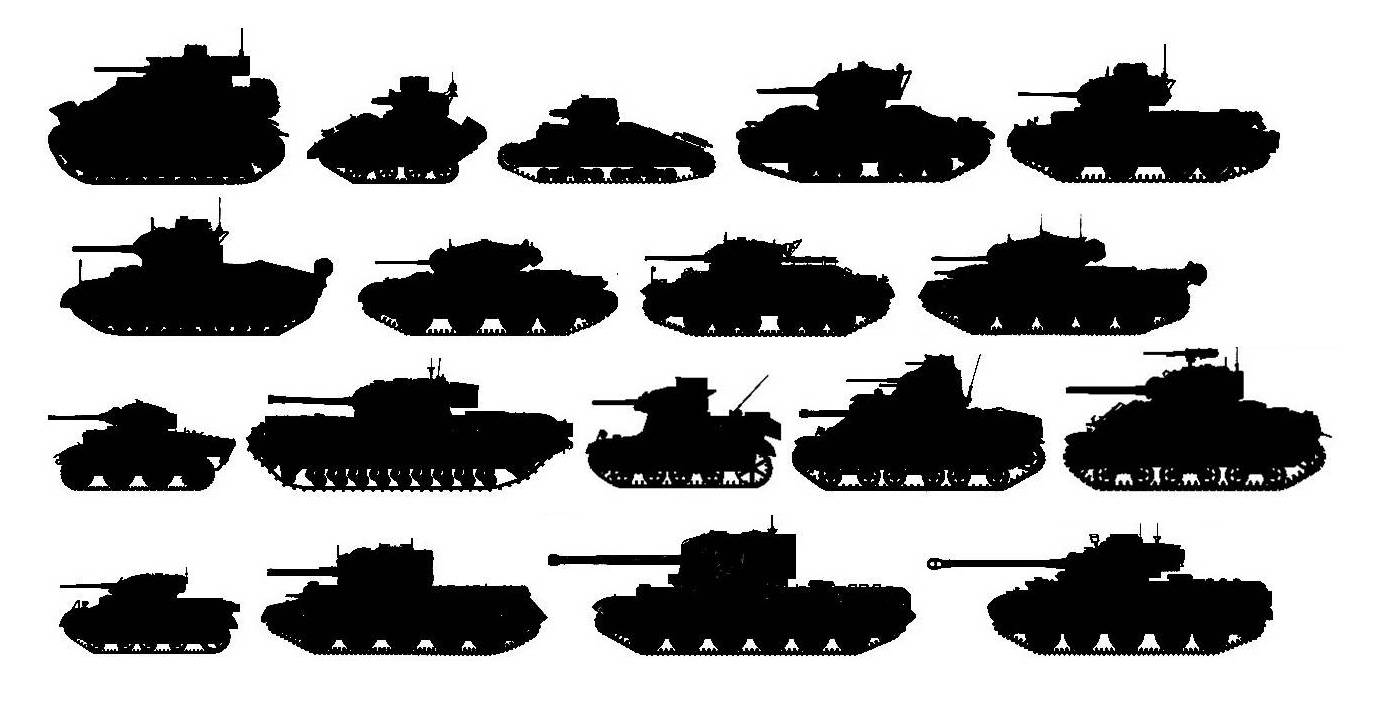
All tanks operated by the British during WW2

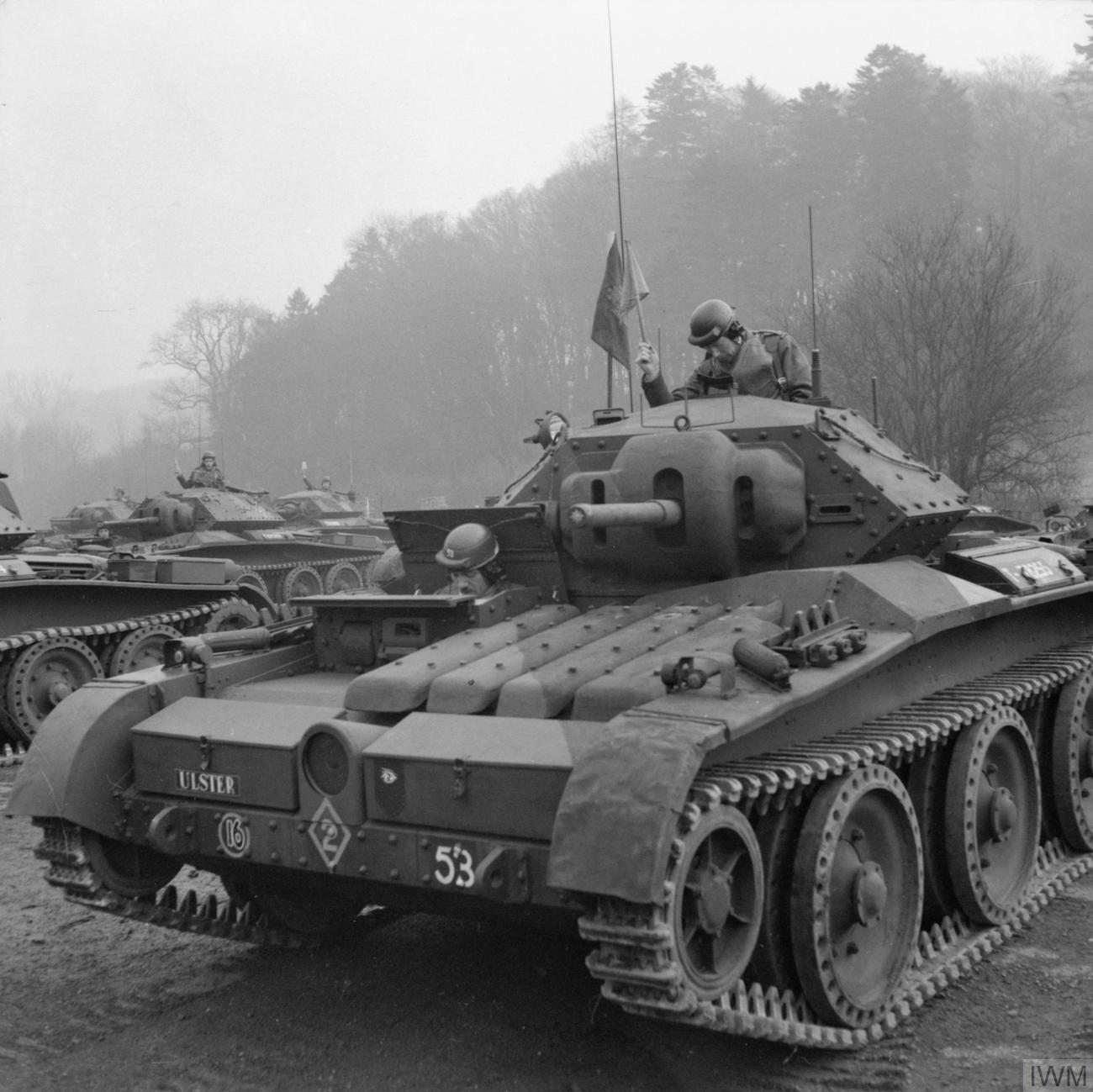
Cruiser tank Mk V Covenanters of the 2nd (Armoured) Irish Guards, Guards Armoured Division

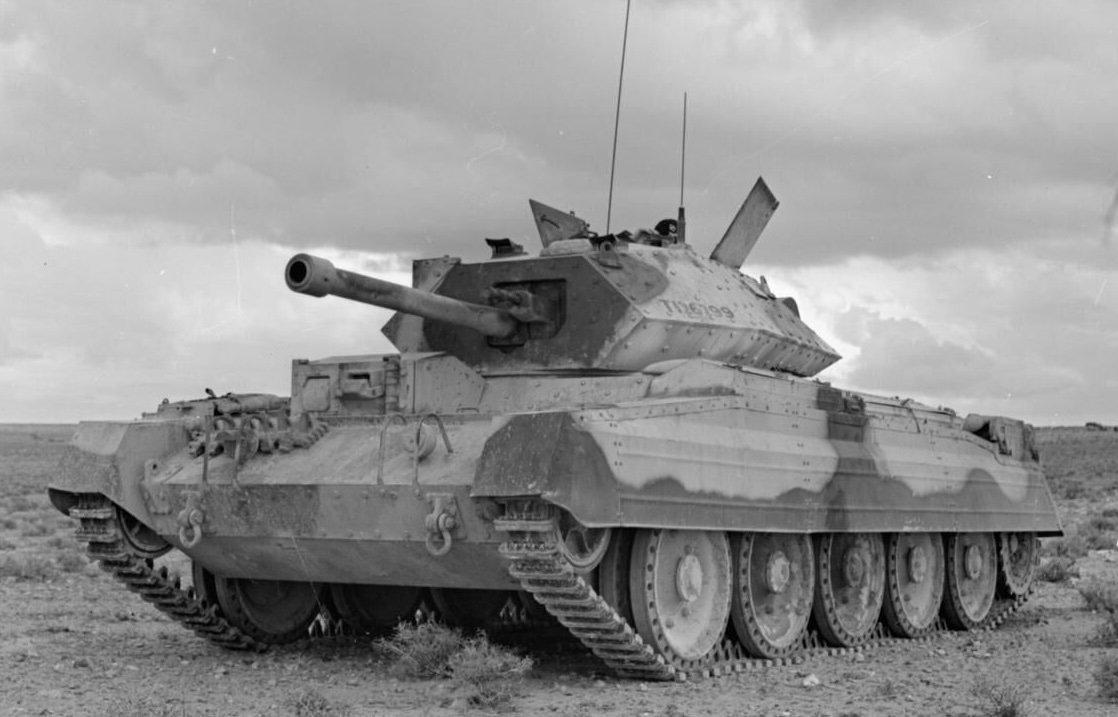
Crusader Mk III

=== Desert Campaign ===
When the BEF returned to the United Kingdom, nearly all their armour was left behind and the remaining Matilda Mk Is were withdrawn. The Matilda II was used up to early 1942, in the war in North Africa, the Matilda II proved highly effective against Italian tanks, although vulnerable again to the larger calibre and medium calibre anti-tank guns. When the German Afrika Korps arrived in North Africa, the 88 millimetres (3.5 in) anti-aircraft gun was again pressed into the anti-tank role against the Matilda, causing heavy losses, and, by the time of the Second Battle of El Alamein in October 1942, few Matildas were still in service.

Combat experience against the Germans in the Western Desert Campaign demonstrated to the British many shortcomings with their cruiser tanks. The Cruiser Mk I was an effective tank in the French, Greek and early North African campaigns. The 2-pdr gun was lethal against the primitive Italian tanks encountered first during the North African campaign, but was, at best, a mediocre weapon against the modern German armour of the Afrika Korps. The heavier Cruiser, Mk II (A10), were part of the British Expeditionary Force (BEF) sent to France in the early stages of the Second World War. Their cross-country performance was initially recorded as poor but they were still used later in North Africa at the defence of Tobruk in 1941, where reliability and suspension performance in the desert conditions was praised.

Hence a request was made in 1941 to the Nuffield Organization's subsidiary and Leyland Motors for a new heavy cruiser tank that could achieve battle superiority over German models. With the A34 Specification later called "Comet" the tank designers were to use a new gun, the "77mm HV". This gun used the same calibre (76.2 mm) projectiles as the 17-pounder but the shell casing was from the older QF 3 inch 20 cwt gun (loaded to higher pressures) permitting a smaller gun that could be readily fitted into a tank. The A34 Comet began to be delivered by September 1944. Intended to be in service by December 1944, crew training was delayed by the German Ardennes Offensive. By the end of the war, 1,200 had been produced.

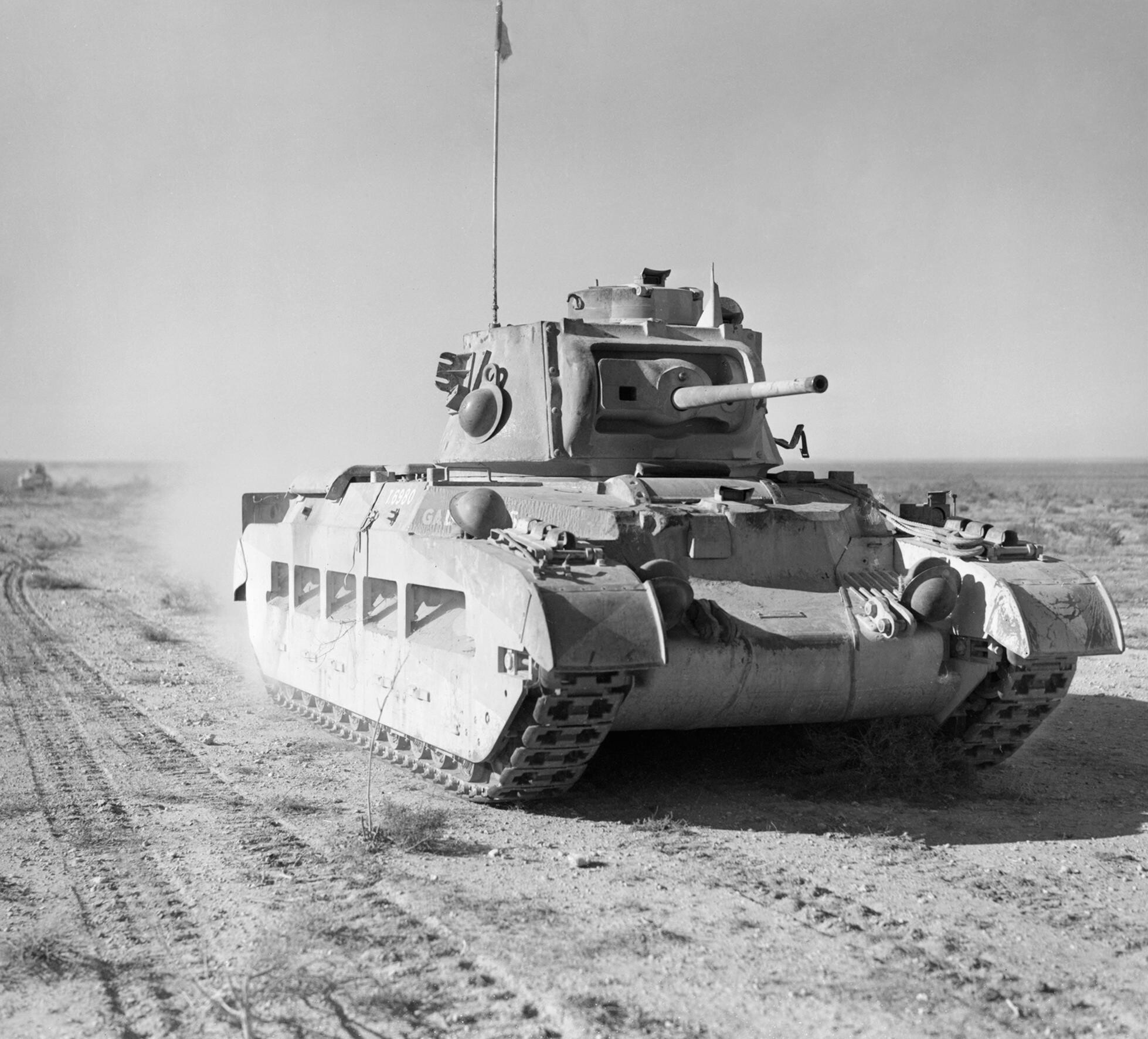
An A12 Infantry Tank Mark II best known as Matilda II advancing through Egypt as part of Operation Compass

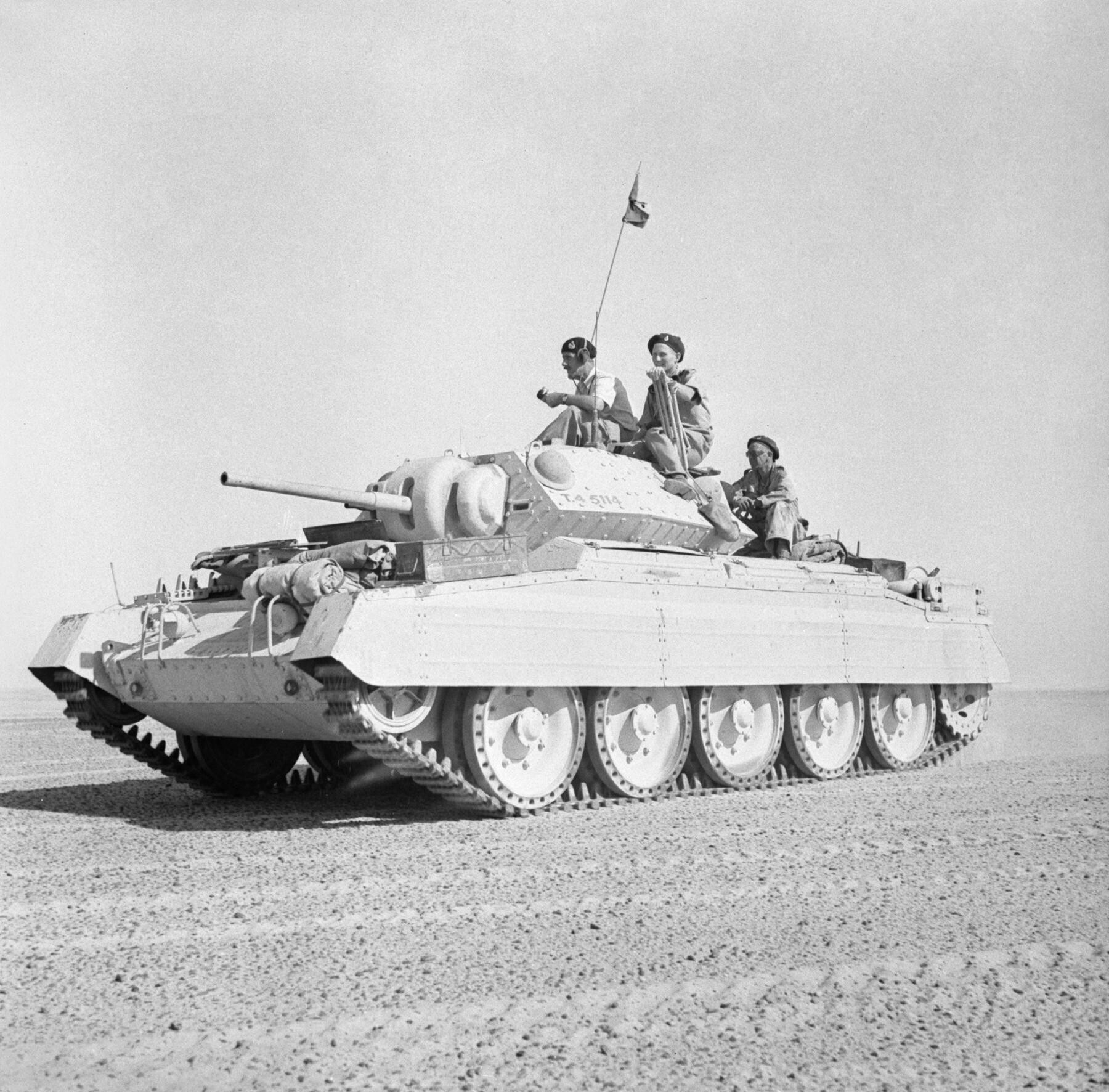
A Crusader II tank in the Western Desert, 2 October 1942

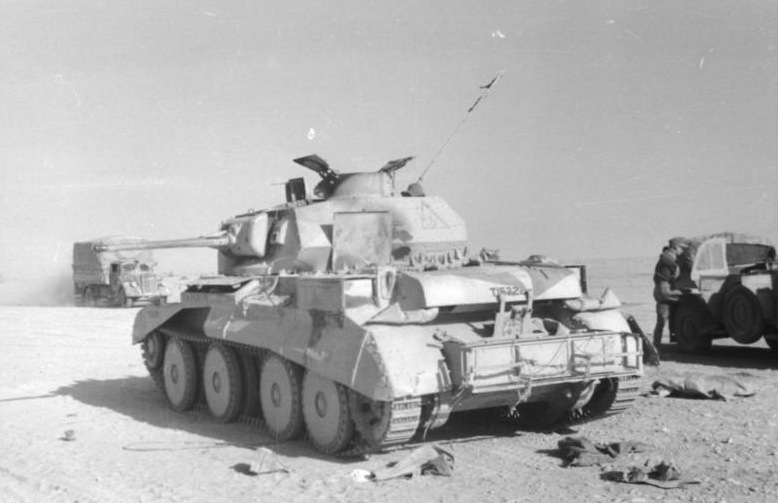
A British Cruiser Mk IV tank destroyed in the North African Campaign

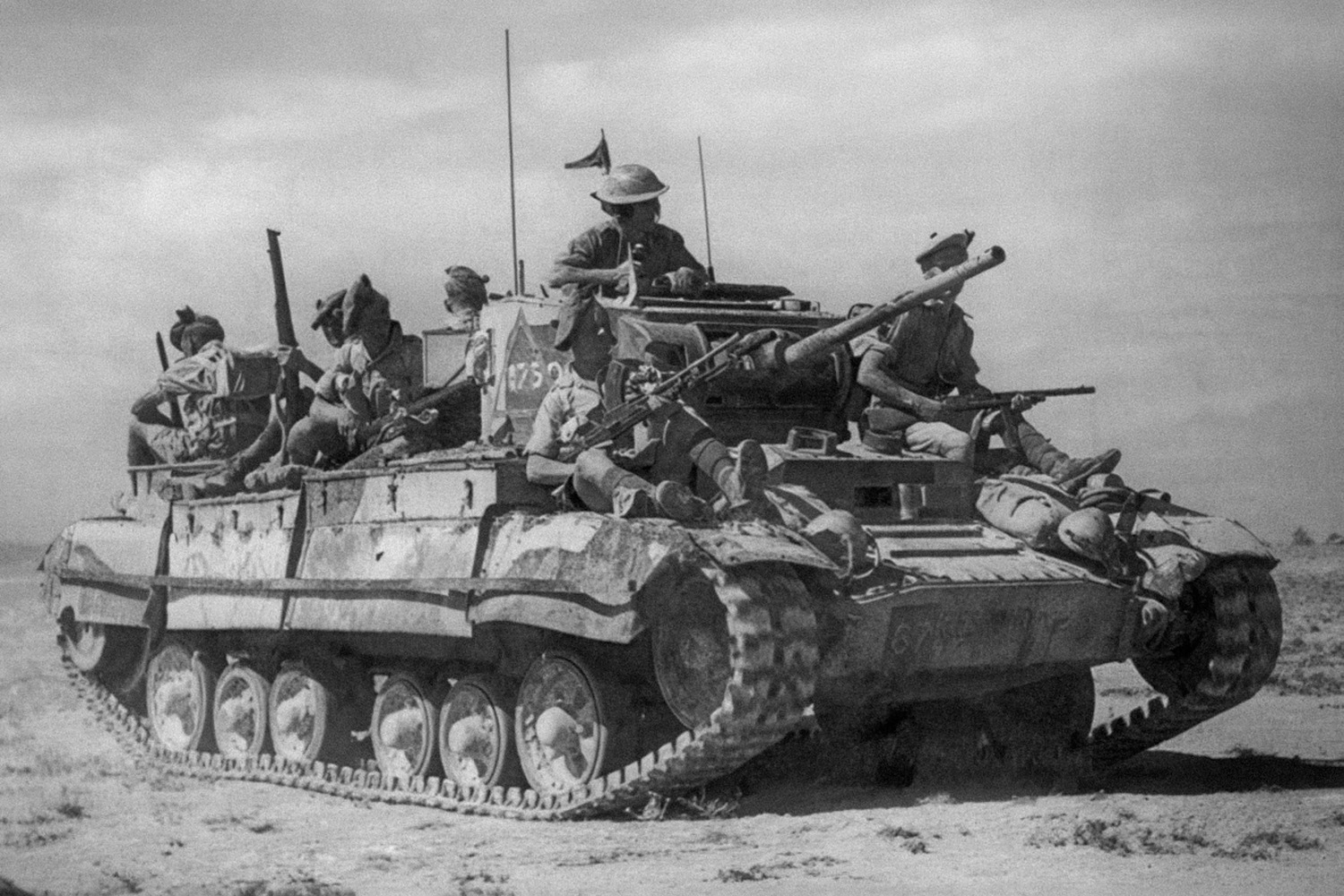
A Valentine in North Africa, carrying infantry from a Scottish regiment

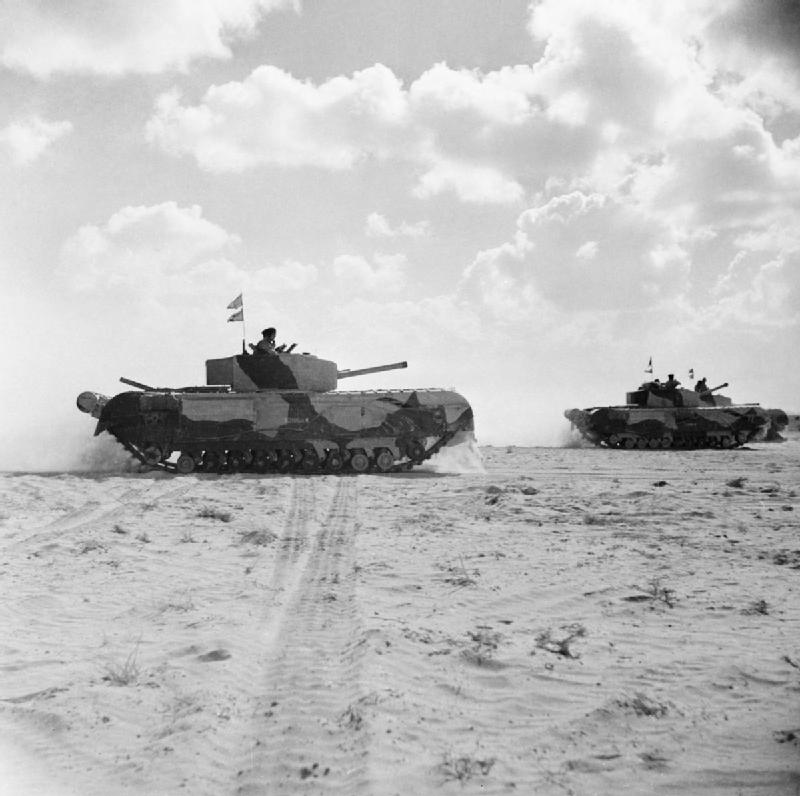
Churchill tanks of 'Kingforce' during the Second Battle of El Alamein

They were followed by the Valentine tank (Infantry Tank Mk III) and Churchill tank (Infantry Tank Mk IV). Designed using the interior and chassis layout of the experimental A10, the Valentine met an emergency 1938 requirement for a tank to supplement the Matilda. Ordered "off the drawing board" in 1939, by the time production ceased in 1944, some 8,275 of these sturdy tanks had been built. Considered stable and reliable by its crews, the tank was only hampered by its small size. Unlike the Matilda tanks, this model allowed the later fitting of a larger main gun but at the expense of operating a two-man turret. The initial riveted construction soon was replaced by welding. The Valentine proved to be difficult to develop further but the Churchill went through successive variants and served up to the end of the war. The early Churchills were fraught with mechanical defects and required many changes before they were considered sound. The army had this machine designed to meet a possible need for a tank to operate in a "shelled area" on the Western Front which in 1939 was expected to eventually look like 1918. The initial A20 design was not successful which caused Vauxhall to take over from Harland and Wolff. The Vauxhall design was called the A22 and the first production vehicles were delivered around the middle of 1941. Eventually, the teething problems were resolved and the tank went on to become one of the best tanks in the army. The tank was refined into many special roles, mostly with the Royal Engineers. The tank had excellent weight distribution and was considered very stable in movement.

As British cruiser tank designs developed into larger tanks with more powerful engines, they could carry larger guns and more armour yet still achieved high speeds. At the end of the war the cruiser tank lineage led to the "universal tank" in the form of the Centurion.

In practice the British did not operate only infantry and cruiser tanks. Lack of production capacity meant the large scale adoption of US medium tanks.

The Cruiser Mk I was an effective tank in the French, Greek and early North African campaigns. The 2 pdr gun was lethal against the primitive Italian tanks encountered during the North African campaign, but was, at best, a mediocre weapon against the modern German armour of the Afrika Korps. Engaging the more thinly armoured flanks and rear of German tanks was generally the only way to have any effect. The minimal armour made the A9 an easy kill for most German anti-tank weapons. Also problematic was the lack of High Explosive shells for the 2 pdr gun and even worse the lack of AP for the 95 mm gun on the Close Support version. Another issue was that the areas around the front machine gun turrets created a frontal surface that was more vulnerable to enemy fire than it would have been had it been a flat plate, let alone a sloped glacis.

A number of Cruiser Mark IIs were part of the British Expeditionary Force (BEF) sent to France in the early stages of the Second World War II. The A10 cross country performance was recorded as poor, but they were still used later in North Africa at the defence of Tobruk in 1941, where reliability and suspension performance in the desert conditions was praised. Sixty worn out examples were taken to Greece, by the 3rd Royal Tank Regiment and although they performed well against the German tanks, over 90% were lost due to mechanical breakdowns as opposed to enemy action (mainly tracks). (See "A Tankie's Travels" By Robert Watt ISBN 1-84683-021-4)

The bright spots of British tank design included the Valentine, Churchill (A22), Cromwell (A27M), and Comet I (A34), which together made up a little over half of total British tank production during WWII. The Valentine was a reliable, heavily armoured infantry-support tank used successfully in the desert and by the Red Army as a light tank. The Churchill had heavy armour and good off-road capability. The Cromwell was in most respects the equal of the early model Sherman of the United States or the German Panzer IV, though by the time of its first major deployment in France in the summer of 1944, it was unremarkable compared to many other vehicles being fielded by then, its best advantage being its speed and mobility. The Comet was a design that improved on the Cromwell, fielded in the final months of the war with a modified, slightly less powerful, variant of the 17pdr, known as the 77mm QF. As a stop-gap, the Challenger (A30) Cruiser Tank, mounted a 17 Pounder gun on a lengthened Cromwell chassis with an extra road wheel each side and a widened hull centre section. From June 1944, it added heavier anti-tank firepower to cruiser tank reconnaissance units until the Comet became widely available.

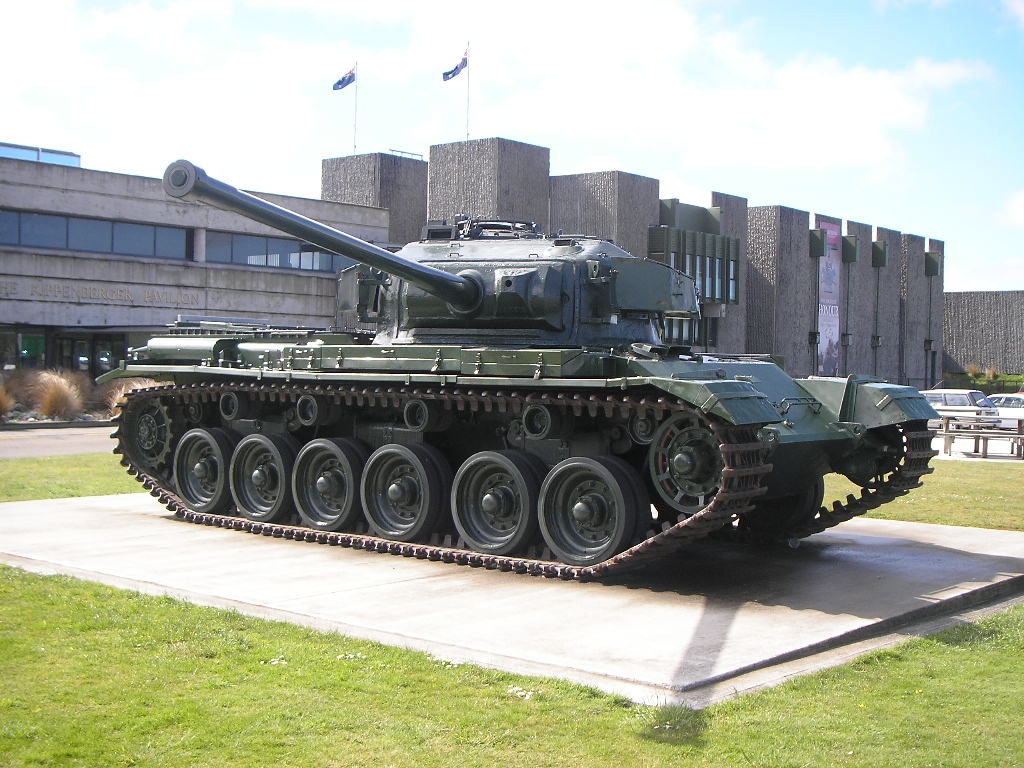
Centurion tank

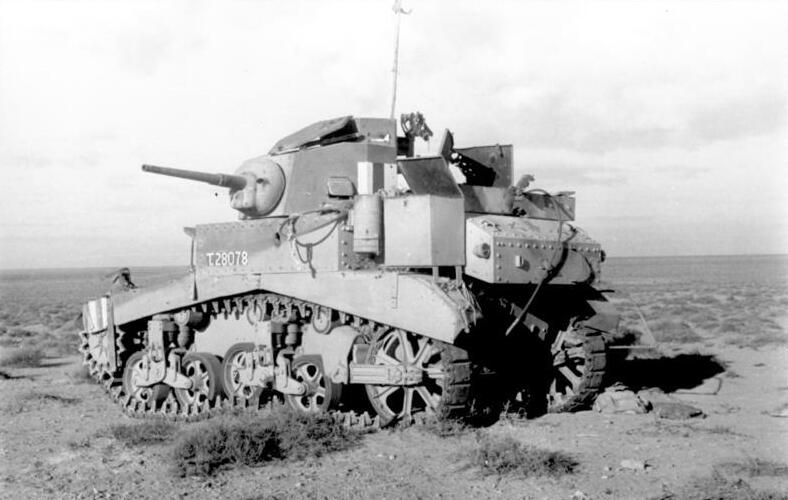
A British M3 (Stuart I) knocked out during fighting in North Africa

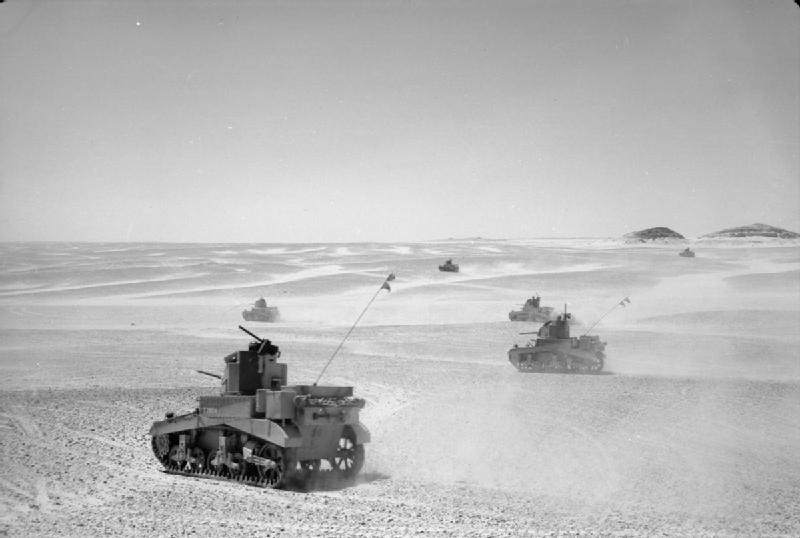
Stuart tanks of the 8th King's Royal Irish Hussars in North Africa, August 1941

=== US imports ===
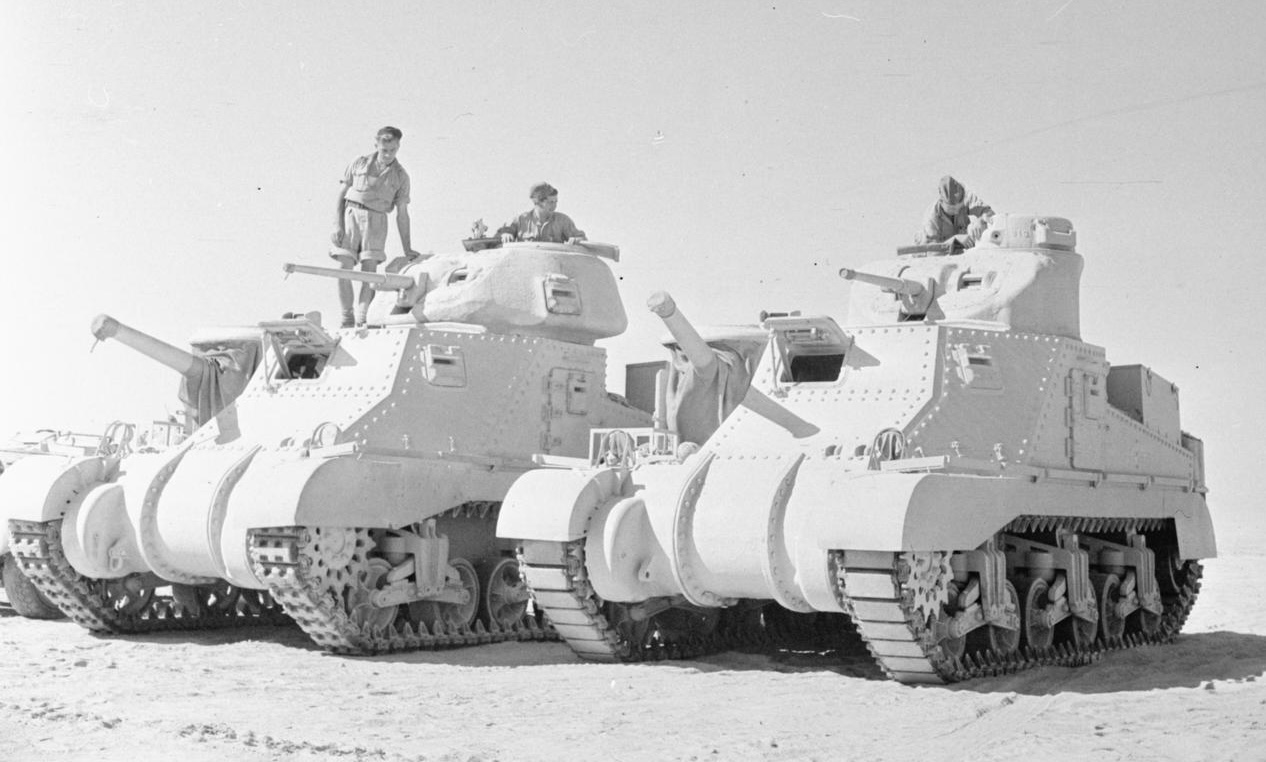
British Grant (left) and Lee (right) tanks in the Egyptian desert

Beginning about 1942, most British tank units were equipped with vehicles supplied from the United States, such as the Stuart light tank, the Lee (or the Grant variant thereof) and the Lee's/Grant's replacement, the Sherman. The Stuart tanks were the first to come in with the 8th Hussars, and were part of the force of the 1st Armoured Division and also were part of the 4th Armoured Brigade and used for Operation Crusader.

=== D-Day ===
British Cromwell tank

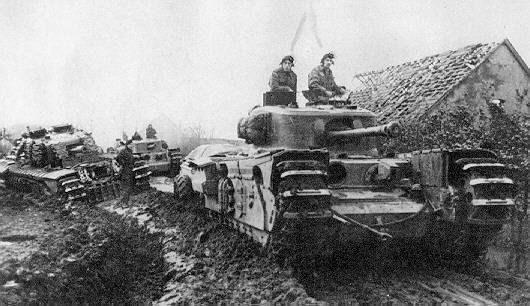
Mk IV Churchill (A22) Infantry tank

Immediately before and during the war, the British produced an enormous array of prototype tanks and modified tanks for a variety of specialist tasks (see Hobart's Funnies). For example, the Churchill AVRE mounted a 230 mm (11.4") direct-fire mortar which was used for destroying buildings and clearing obstacles. Responsibility for the buildup of vehicles and the training of crews to use them was given to armoured warfare expert Percy Hobart after whom the collection was named.

Many of the ideas had already been tried, tested or were in experimental development both by Britain and other nations. For example, the Scorpion flail tank (a modified Matilda tank) had already been used during the North African campaign to clear paths through German minefields. Soviet T-34 tanks had been modified with mine-rollers. Close-support tanks, bridgelayers, and fascine carriers had been developed elsewhere also. However, the Funnies were the largest and most elaborate collection of engineering vehicles available.

By early 1944, Hobart could demonstrate to Eisenhower and Montgomery a brigade each of swimming DD tanks, Crab mine clearers, and AVRE (Engineer) tanks along with a regiment of Crocodile flamethrowing tanks.

Montgomery considered that the U.S. forces should use them, and offered them a half-share of all the vehicles available, but take-up was minimal. Eisenhower was in favour of the amphibious tanks but left the decision on the others to Lieutenant General Omar Bradley, then commanding the U.S. First Army. Bradley requested 25 flail tanks and 100 Churchill Crocodiles and the British War Office agreed to supply them as well as British-crewed AVREs. In the event though there was insufficient time to produce the vehicles and train the crews so on the day American forces were limited to DD tanks and their own Sherman bulldozer tanks and armoured bulldozers.

The British at Normandy were re-equipped with some of the newer British and American tanks and a few days after D-Day, the Armoured Reconnaissance regiment of the 7th Armoured Division landed at Le Hamel on Gold Beach with Cromwell tanks and began going into action almost immediately in the fighting around Villers-Bocage. The tanks were used in the advance through the Bocage with the 22nd Armoured Brigade. They were involved in action against the 2nd Panzer Division, with the tanks leading the way out of the bridgehead.

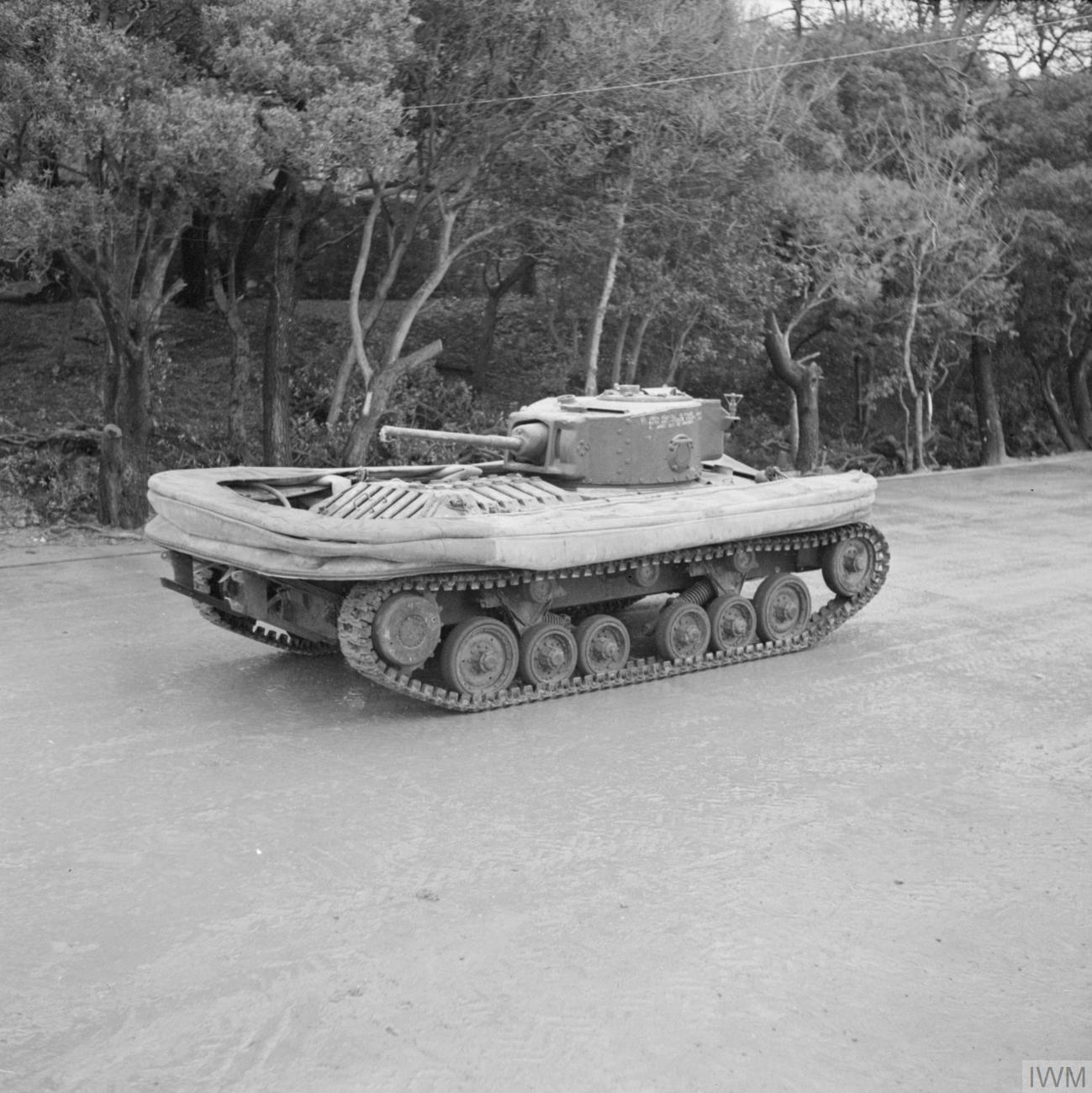
Valentine DD tank with screen lowered and gun pointing towards the rear of the vehicle.

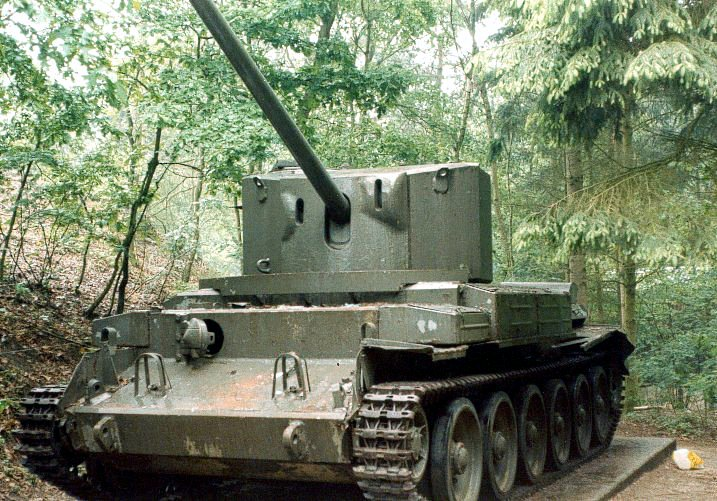
British Challenger (A30) tank

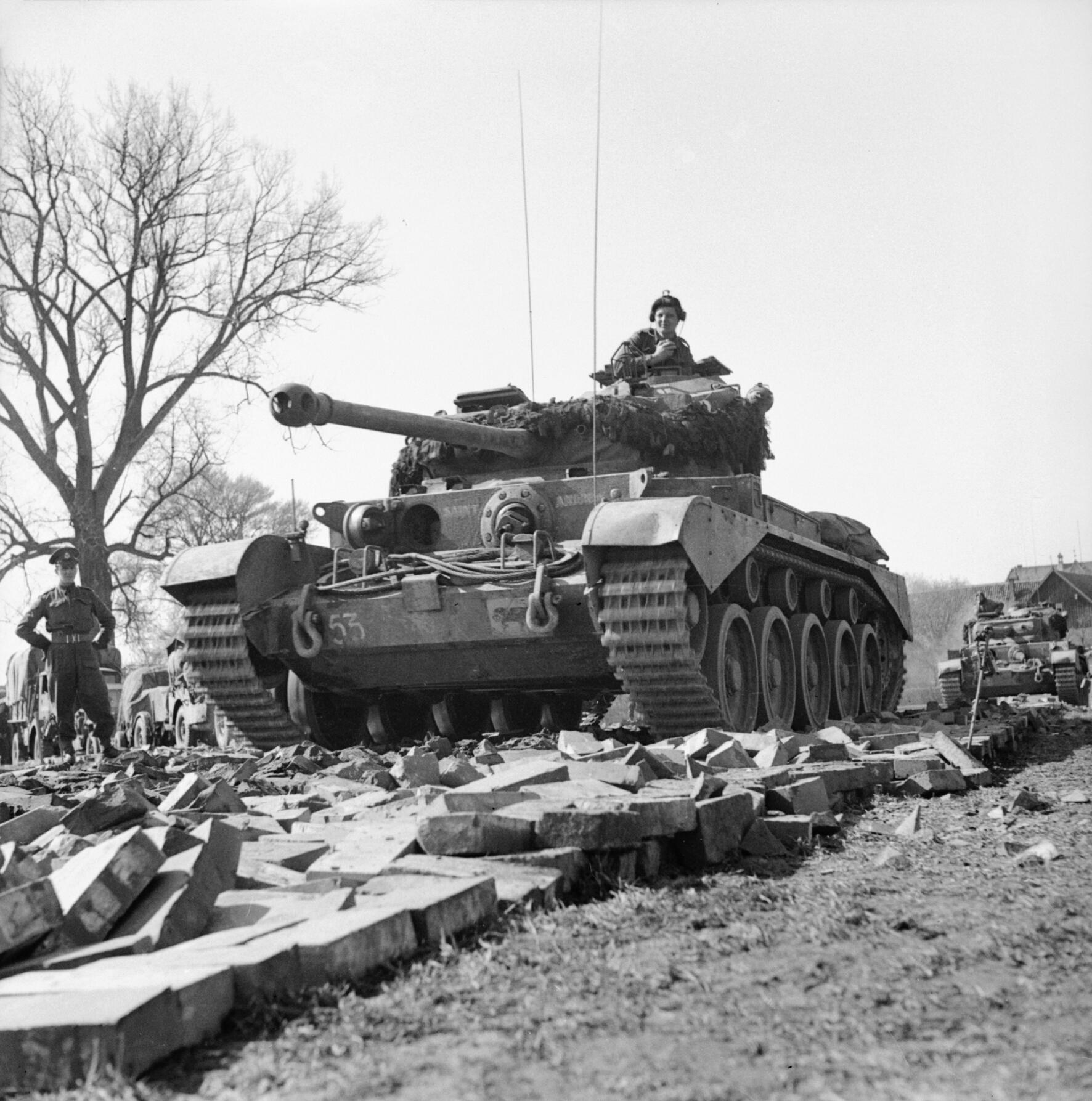
Comet tanks of the 2nd Fife and Forfar Yeomanry, 11th Armoured Division, crossing the Weser at Petershagen, Germany, 7 April 1945

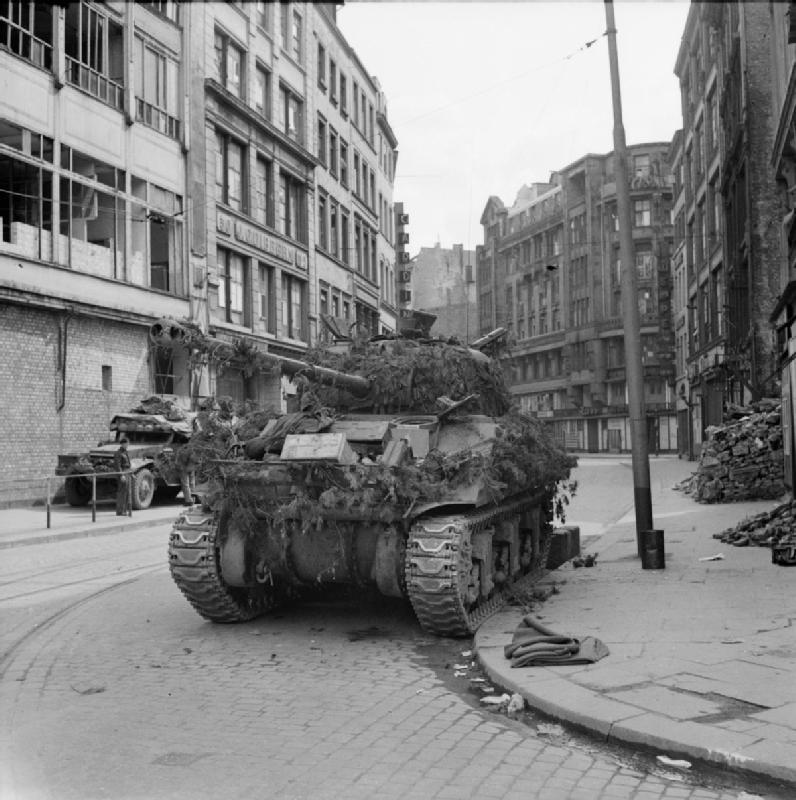
Sherman Firefly – Hamburg 1945

== Early Cold War ==
During the Cold War (1945–1990), the two opposing forces in Europe were the Warsaw Pact countries on the one side, and the North Atlantic Treaty Organization (NATO) countries on the other side. Soviet domination of the Warsaw Pact led to effective standardization on a few tank designs. In comparison, the main NATO countries, Britain, France, Germany, and the USA, developed their own tank designs with little in common, and the smaller counties generally adopted one or more of these designs.

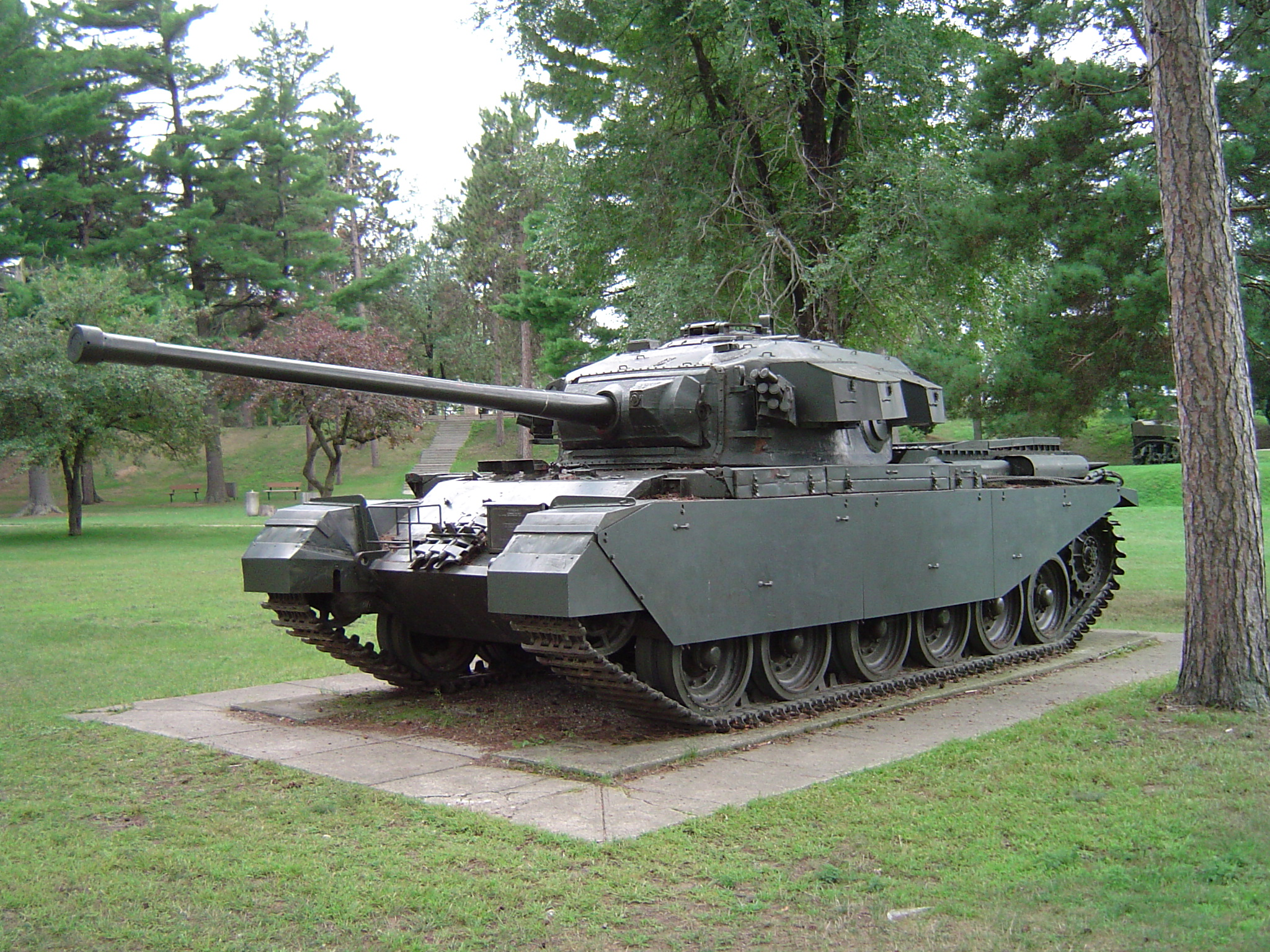
British main battle tank Centurion Mk3

For the UK regiments, the Centurion was the primary British tank of the post-Second World War period. Development of the tank began in 1943 and manufacture of the Centurion, began in January 1945. With the 20-pounder gun it first entered combat with the British Army in the Korean War in 1950, in support of the UN forces. It was noted for its high mobility, able to climb to the top of hills that were considered difficult for infantry, let alone tanks. Upgraded to mount the 105 mm L7 gun, it became the UK's first main battle tank.

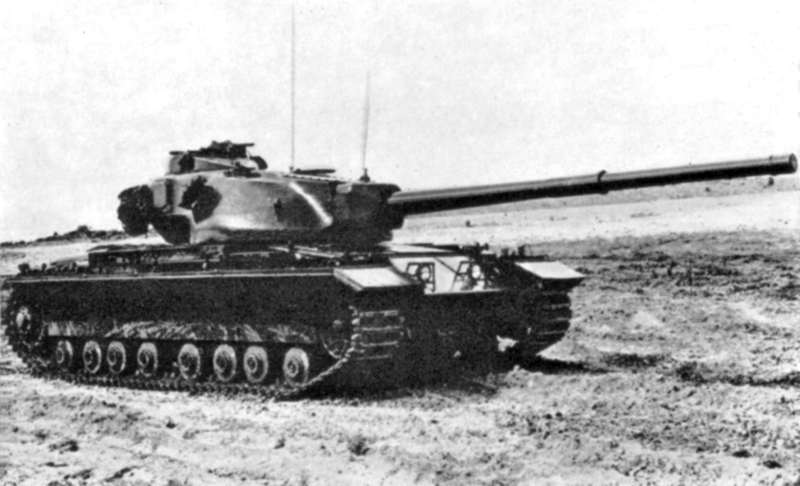
Conqueror Mk 2

At first, the Centurion was not considered capable of dealing with all Soviet tanks and it was joined by a traditional heavy tank design, the Conqueror. This design was almost as heavy as the German WWII King Tiger and was tasked with dealing with the heavy Soviet designs like the Joseph Stalin IS-3. They were issued at nine for each regiment in Germany; usually grouped in three tank troops. It used the American 120 mm gun and was expected to give long range firepower and support to the Centurion tanks that made up the bulk of British tank force. To provide even more firepower for the British Army of the Rhine tank units, Charioteer, a variant of the Cromwell tank with a 20 pounder gun, was deployed; it was a defensive weapon, in practice more a self-propelled anti-tank gun.

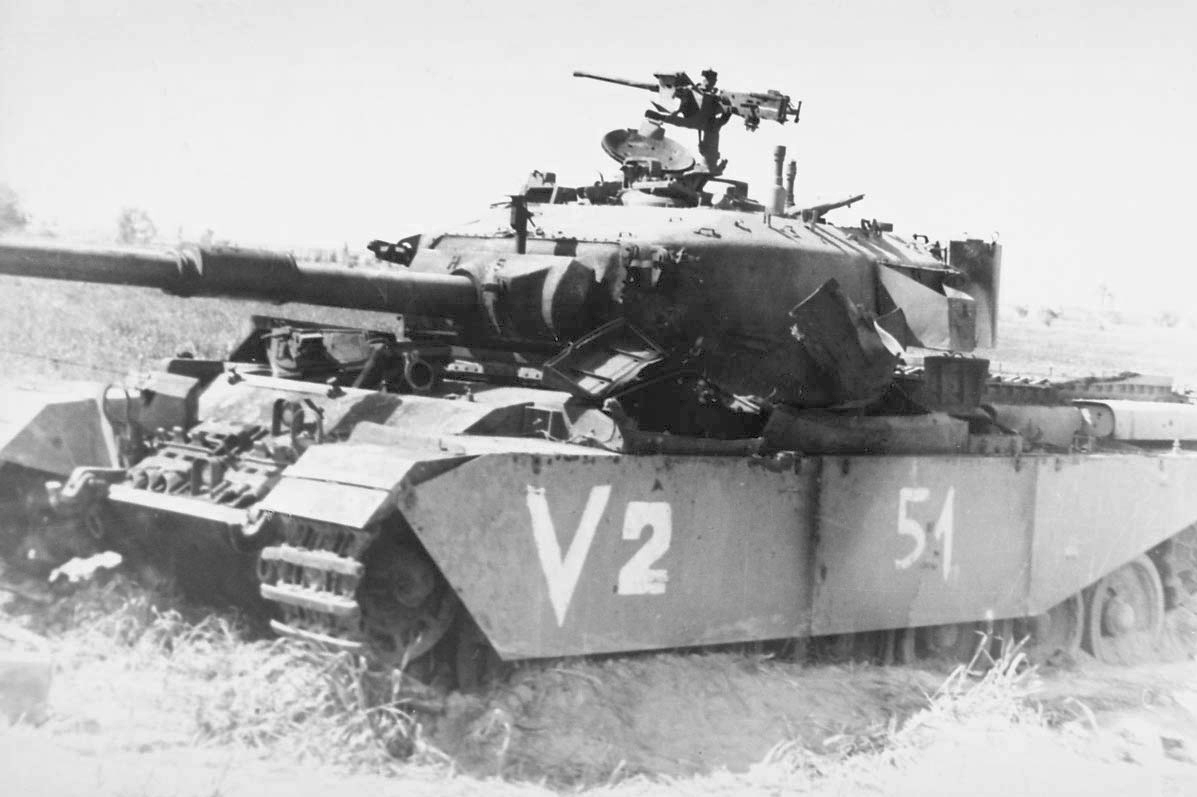
Destroyed Israeli Centurion

This hodge-podge of designs was far from ideal, and there were efforts to improve the Centurion. When equipped with the L7 105 mm gun, along with greatly improved shells, the Centurion was able to penetrate even the heaviest Soviet designs. It became the truly "Universal tank" it had originally been intended and began to displace other designs in service. With future combat thought to be dominated by nuclear weapons, rendering armour as ineffective as infantry, development of newer tank designs began to wane. Instead, designs like the Centurion continued to be improved with the addition of better fire control, stabilization and NBC protection. The Centurion would go on to be one of the most widely used tank designs, equipping armies around the world. Between 1946 and 1962, 4,423 Centurions were produced, consisting of 13 basic marks and numerous variants. As recently as the 2006 Israel-Lebanon conflict the Israel Defense Forces employed modified Centurions as armoured personnel carriers and combat engineering vehicles. South Africa still employs over 200 Centurions.

== Later cold war to today ==
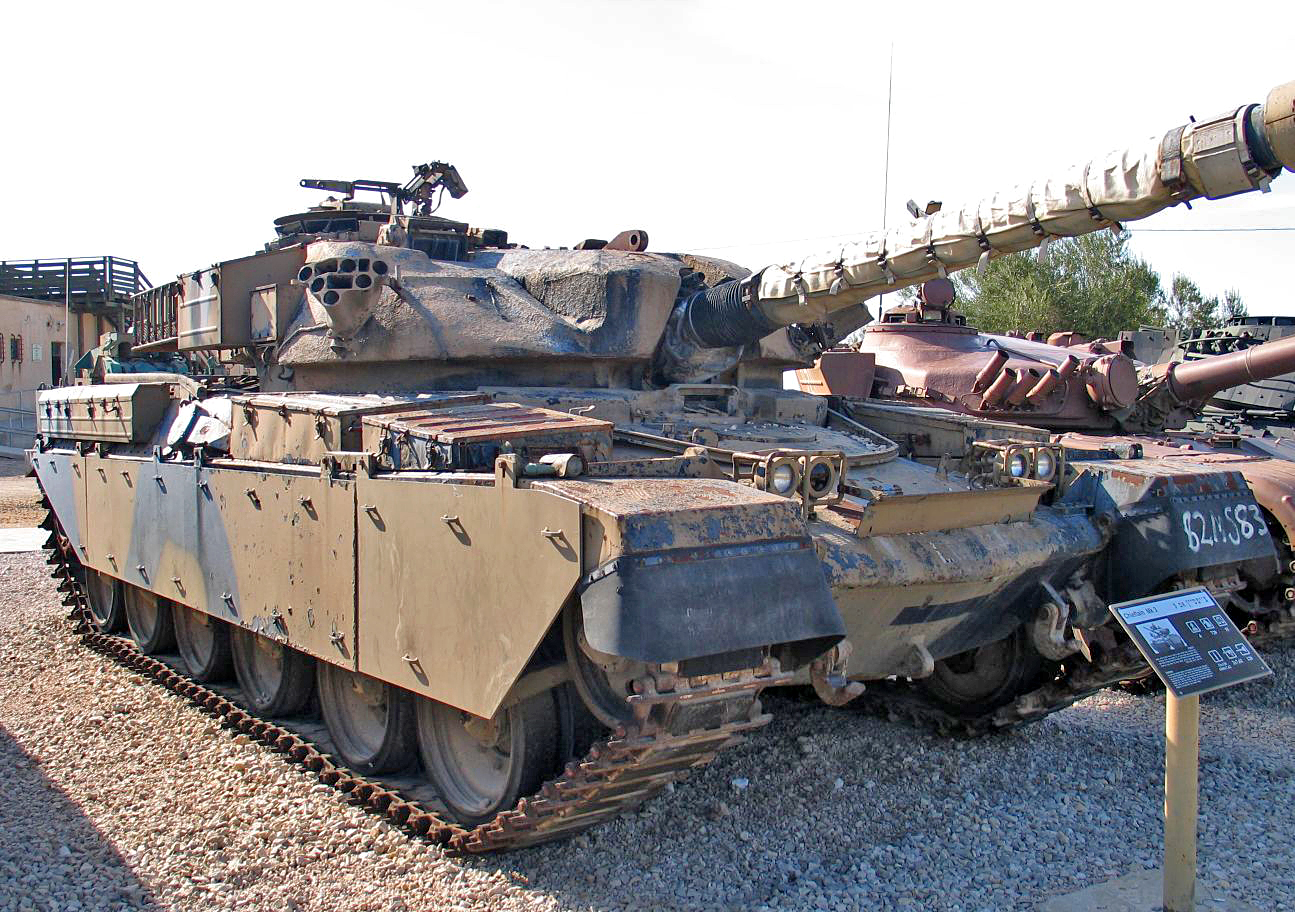
Chieftain

While the L7 equipped Centurion was an excellent tank, improvements in gunnery and especially drivetrain made it possible to equip a tank with the protection and firepower of the Conqueror with the mobility of Centurion. Leyland began experiments on such a design as early as 1956 with early prototypes in 1959. This emerged as the Chieftain, one of the most heavily armed and armoured tanks of its era, and one of the most modern designs in any force of the era. From this point the Army forces relied on single designs, adopting the main battle tank concept whole heartedly.

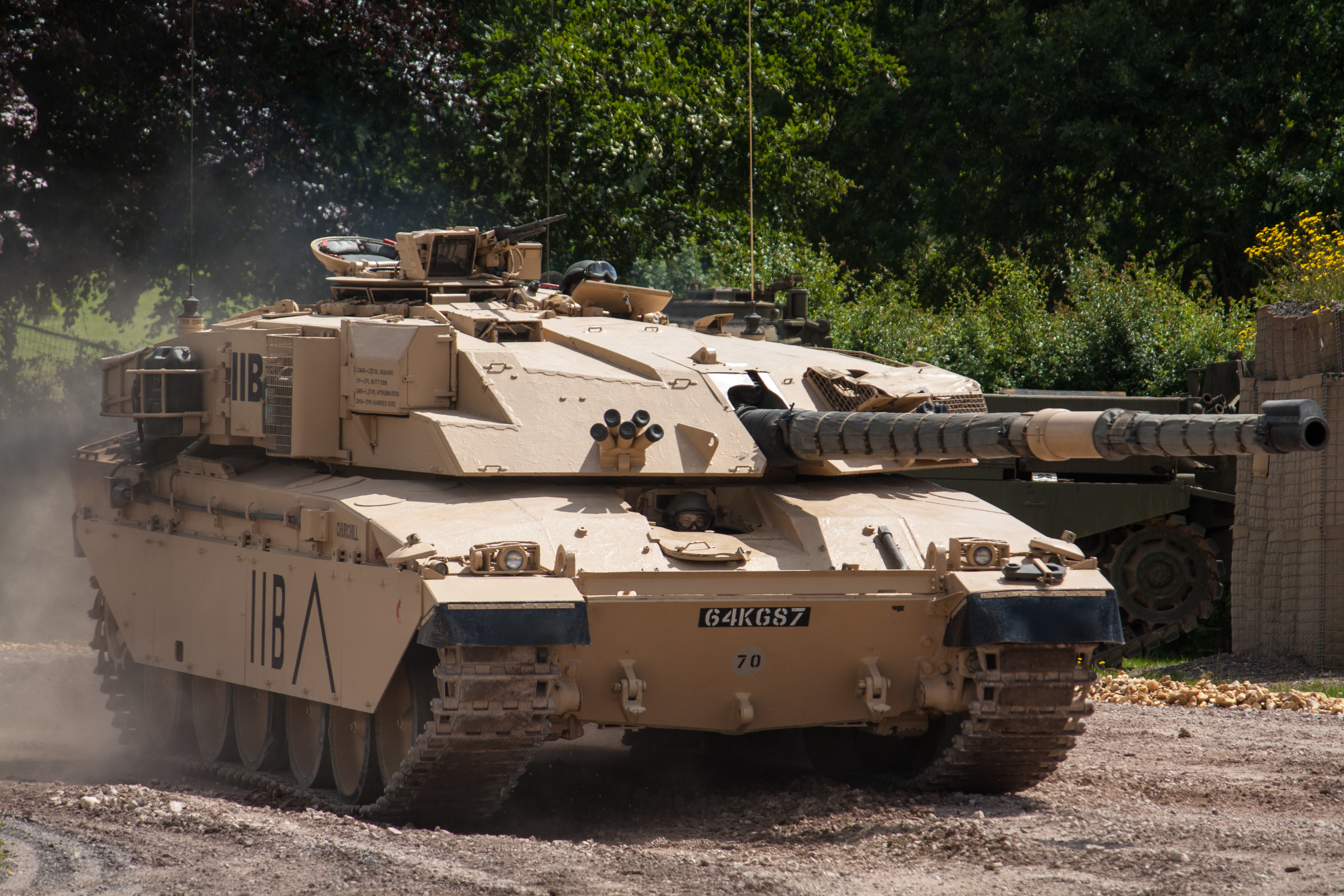
Challenger 1

Iranian orders for an improved Chieftain led to what were initially relatively minor upgrades, but the development of Chobham armour in the 1960s led to the design of a new tank combining a wide variety of improvements, the Challenger. Among its many improvements, the Challenger used a laser rangefinder in a highly automated fire control system, an improved engine, a greatly improved suspension that offered far better off-road performance. Entering service in 1983, it was beaten into NATO service by the M1 Abrams, which also used Chobham armour.

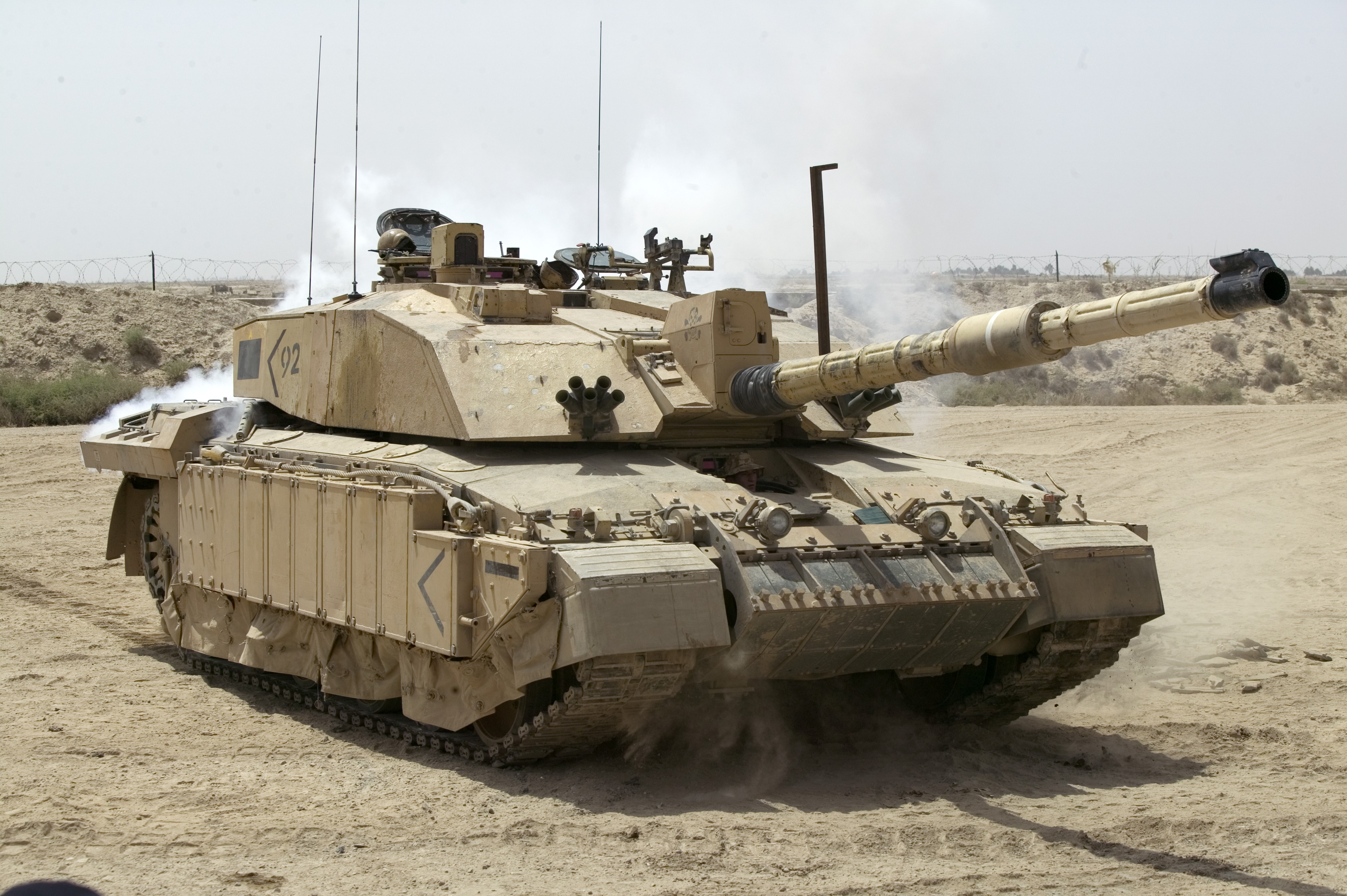
Challenger 2

Almost immediately after the Chieftain entered development, the West German government began collaborating with the British on a new tank design combining features of the Chieftain with a number of new concepts. Development officially began in September 1978 with the aim of introducing a new design in the late 1980s that would replace both British and German designs. This project fell apart, but a number of experimental design concepts were then worked into the Challenger 2, which first entered service in July 1994. The Challenger 2 forms the core of the Army's heavy tank units today.

The Challenger 2 is the main tank currently being used today by the British military in combat situations. It is renowned for its durability and endurance. Only one has ever been recorded as destroyed, of which was due to a friendly fire incident involving another Challenger 2 tank. This is possibly due to the use of Chobham armour for the Challenger's outer armour. Chobham armour is an incredibly tough armour, the details of which still remain secret to the developers. It uses layers of ceramics and other materials, combined in such a way as to withstand extreme heat and impact.

In May 2021 the Ministry of Defence announced that 148 Challenger 3 tanks would be produced by upgrading current Challenger tanks with fully-digitised systems and a smoothbore gun. The contract costing £800 million to be carried out by Rheinmetall BAE Systems Land (RBSL) to be delivered 2027-2030.

=== Gulf War ===
Ground operations during Operation Desert Storm, showing the 1st Armoured Divisions movements

The headquarters of the 1st Armoured Division was deployed to Saudi Arabia in 1990 to command British land forces. It had two brigades under its command, 4th and 7th Armoured Brigade. During the war, it came under the US VII Corps and was part of the great armoured left-hook that destroyed many Iraqi Republican Guard formations. The two brigades in the division alternated heading the advance. The Royal Scots Dragoon Guards, Queens Royal Irish Hussars and 14th/20th Kings Hussars saw active service during the Gulf War in 1991 deploying 57 Challenger tanks per regiment.

The Army contributed 50,000 troops to the coalition force that fought Iraq in the Persian Gulf War. This included Challenger tank units within the 1st Armoured Division

=== Balkans conflicts ===
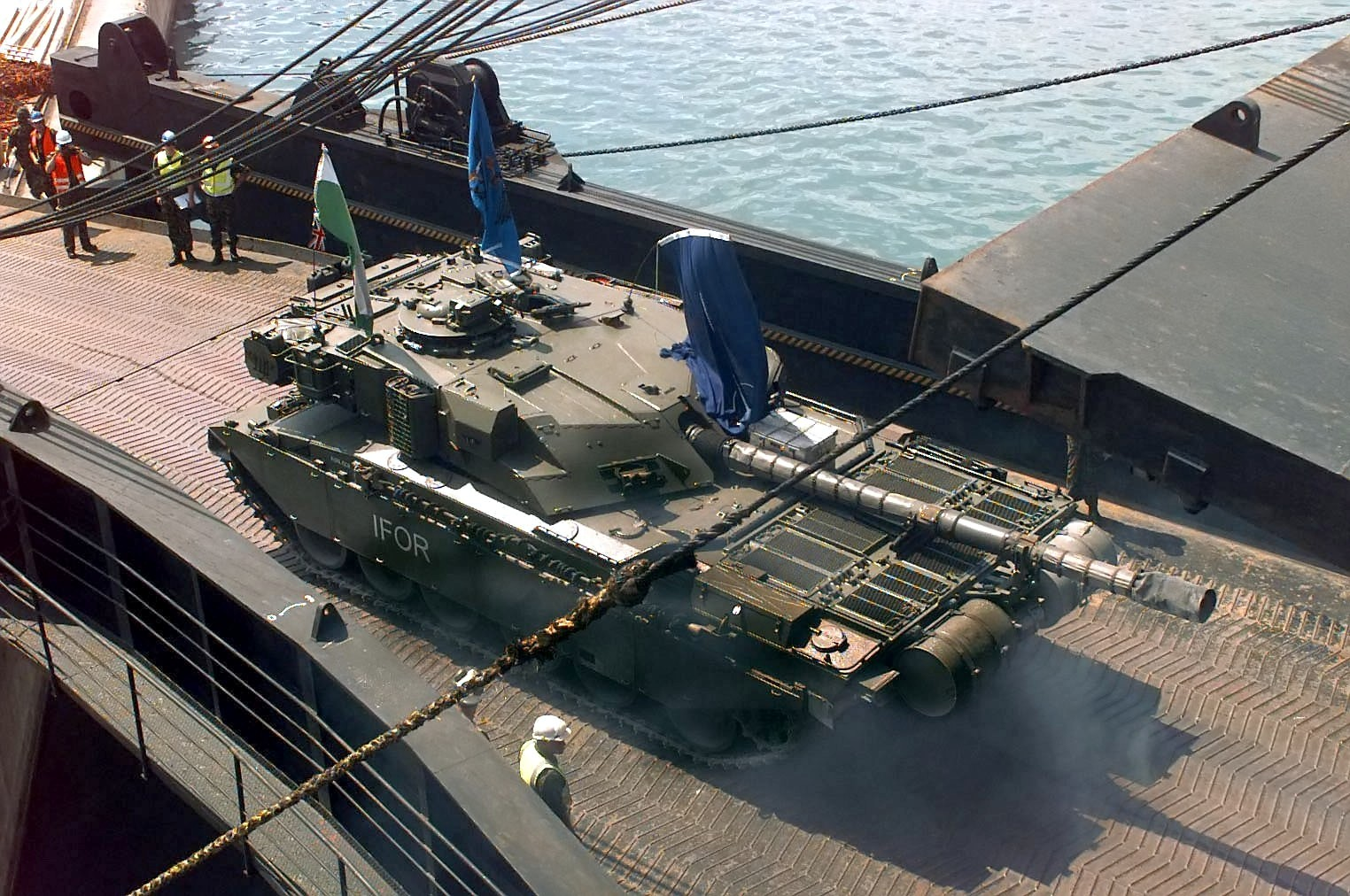
Challenger 1, with turret reversed and IFOR markings, disembarking in Croatia

The British Army was deployed to Yugoslavia in 1992; initially this force formed part of the United Nations Protection Force. Units of the 1st Armoured Division were deployed as part of the Implementation Force (IFOR) in 1995.

=== War in Afghanistan ===
In November 2001 the United Kingdom, as a part of Operation Enduring Freedom with the United States, invaded Afghanistan to topple the Taliban. The 3rd Division were deployed in Kabul, to assist in the liberation of the troubled capital. The British Army was concentrating on fighting Taliban forces and bringing security to Helmand province. Combat operations ended in 2014, although there were some small units that operate in a non combat role to protect healthcare staff and foreign diplomats, as well as a select few who still help train the Afghan National Army.

=== Iraq War ===
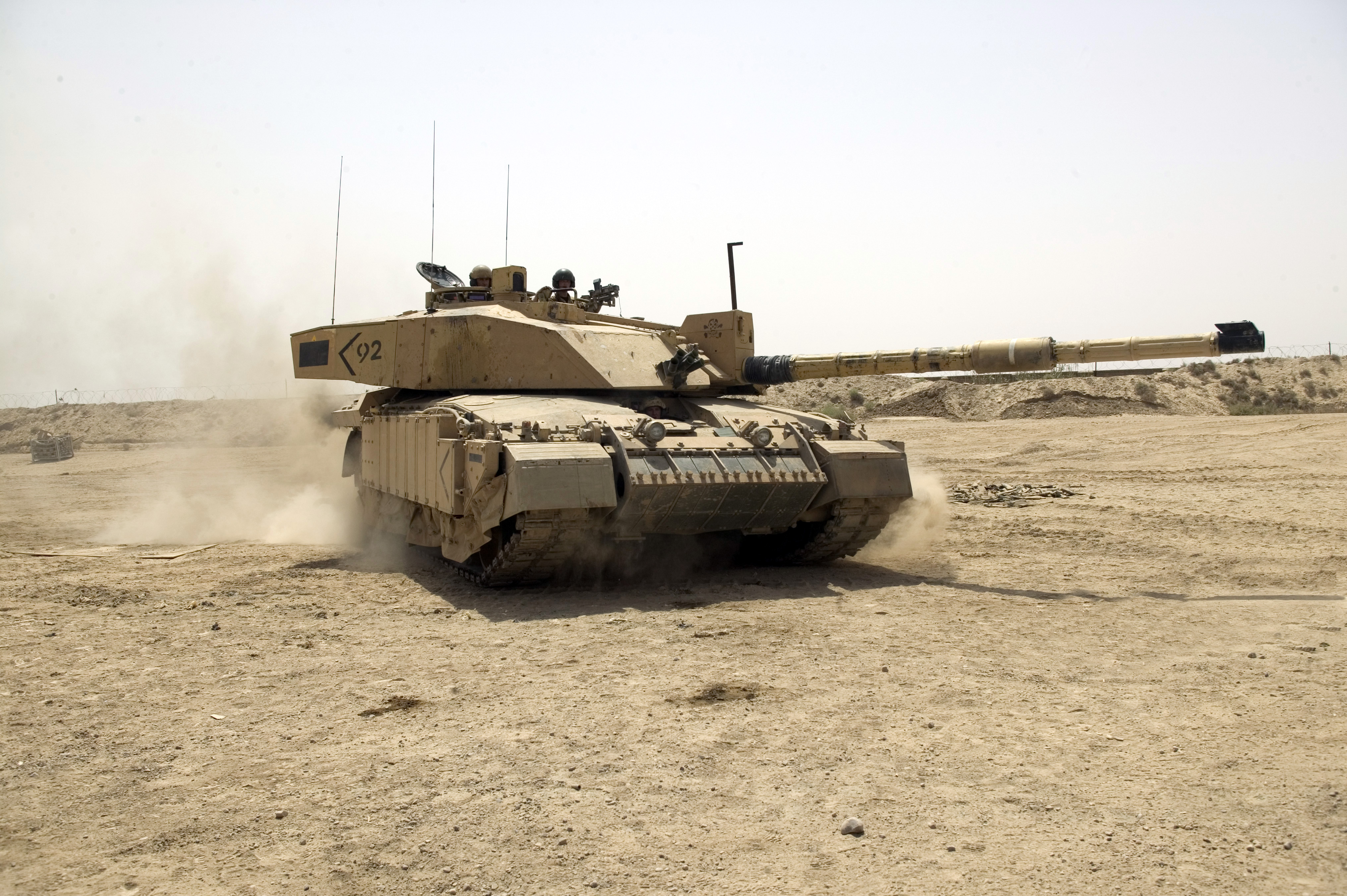
A Challenger 2 tank patrolling outside Basra, Iraq, during Operation Telic

The United Kingdom participated in the 2003 invasion of Iraq, sending a force that would reach 46,000 military personnel. The 7th Armoured Brigade, consisting of 112 Challenger 2 tanks, 140 Warriors and 32 AS-90 155 mm self-propelled howitzers, entered Iraq on 21 March and advanced towards Iraq's second largest city, Basra and helped encircle and isolate it. The brigade, led by the 1st Fusiliers Battlegroup, made a rapid advance towards the city and soon reached its outskirts, securing Basra Airport and the bridges across the Shatt al-Arab. The advance by the brigade met sporadic though fierce resistance, with The Queen's Royal Irish Hussars, including an engagement between 14 Challenger 2s of the Royal Scots Dragoon Guards and 14 Iraqi tanks, all of the Iraqi tanks being destroyed; it was the largest tank engagement by the British Army since WWII.

The 1st Armoured Division, including 7th Brigade, raided the city several times and the Desert Rats, led by Challenger 2s of the Royal Scots Dragoon Guards, Queen's Royal Lancers and 2nd Royal Tank Regiment with Warriors of the 1st Fusiliers, Irish Guards and Black Watch pushed into the city on 6 April and stayed. For the most part, Basra was controlled by 1st Division, though further engagements took place. The war was officially declared over on 1 May. The Desert Rats remained in Iraq after the war, acting as peacekeepers and helping to rebuild the country while based in the British sector in the south of Iraq. The brigade began to leave in late June, being replaced by 19th Mechanised Brigade. The remaining British troops were withdrawn from Iraq after the Iraqi government refused to extend their mandate.

== See also ==
- History of the tank
- Tanks in World War I
- List of interwar armoured fighting vehicles
- Tanks in World War II
- Tank classification
- List of military vehicles
- Rhino tank
