= Challenger 2 =

British main battle tank

FV4034 Challenger 2
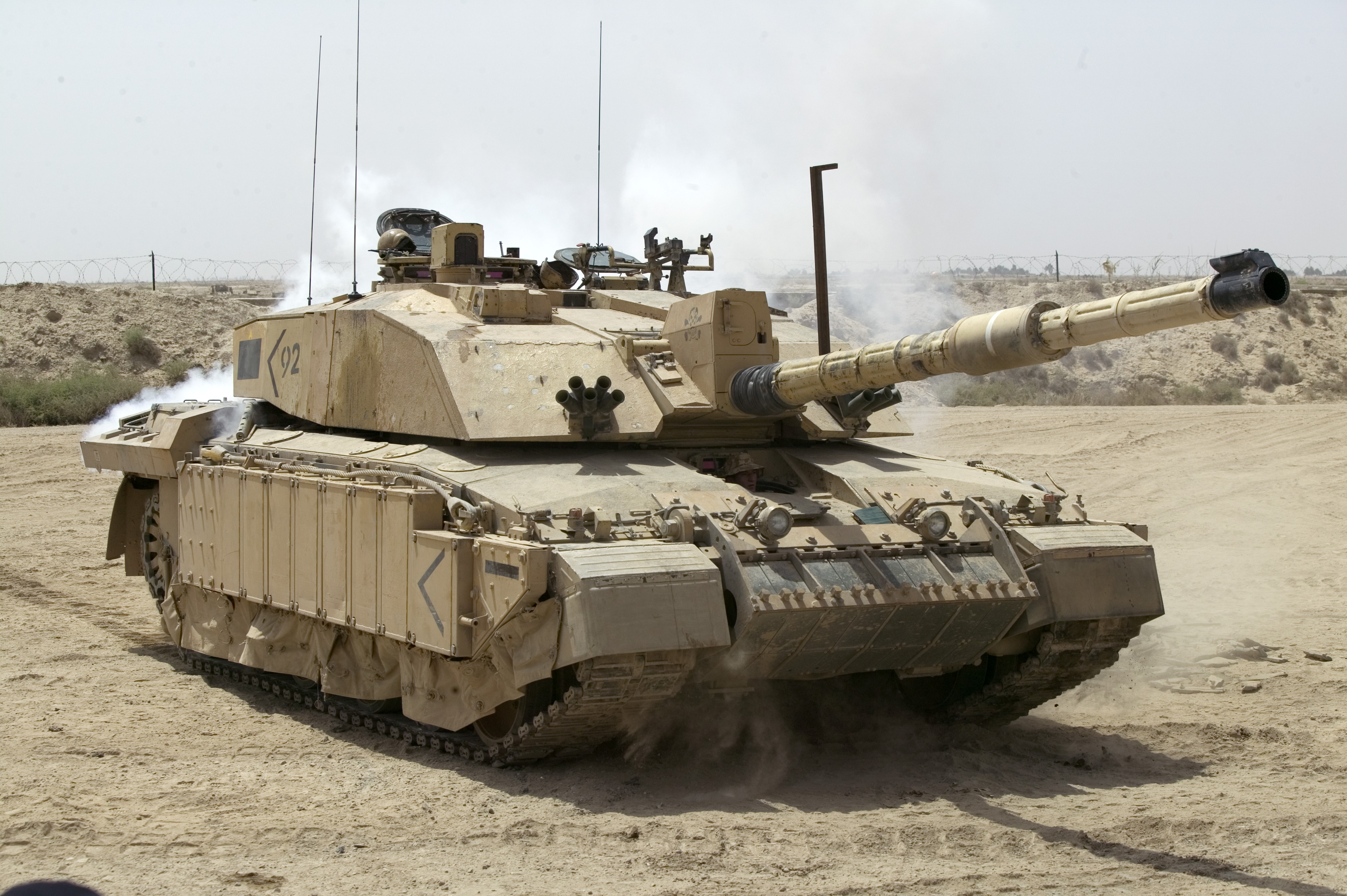
- A Challenger 2 tank patrolling outside Basra, Iraq, during Operation Telic, 2004
- Type: Main battle tank
- Place of origin: United Kingdom

Service history
- In service: 1998–present
- Used by: British Army; Royal Army of Oman; Ukrainian Ground Forces
- Wars: UNMIBH; Kosovo War; Iraq War; Russo-Ukrainian War

Production history
- Designer: Vickers Defence Systems
- Designed: 1986–1993
- Manufacturer: Alvis plc; Vickers plc; BAE Systems Land & Armaments
- Unit cost: £4,217,000 (FY 1999)
- Produced: 1990 (prototypes); 1993–2002 (main production)
- No. built: about 447

Specifications
- Mass: 64 t (63 long tons; 71 short tons), 75 t (74 long tons; 83 short tons) with combat armour modules
- Length: 8.3 m (27 ft 3 in), 13.5 m (44 ft 3 in) gun forward
- Width: 3.5 m (11 ft 6 in), 4.2 m (13 ft 9 in) with appliqué armour
- Height: 2.49 m (8 ft 2 in)
- Crew: 4 (commander, gunner, loader–operator, driver)
- Armour: Chobham / Dorchester Level 2 (classified)
- Main armament: L30A1 120 mm rifled gun with 47 rounds
- Secondary armament: 7.62 mm coaxial L94A1 chain gun; 7.62 mm L37A2 loader–operator hatch machine gun
- Engine: Perkins CV12-6A V12 diesel 26.1 L (1,590 cu in); 1,200 bhp (890 kW)
- Power/weight: 18.7 hp/t (13.9 kW/t) at 64 t; 16 hp/t (11.9 kW/t) at 75 t
- Transmission: David Brown TN54E epicyclic transmission (6 fwd., 2 rev.)
- Suspension: Hydropneumatic
- Ground clearance: 0.5 m (1 ft 8 in)
- Fuel capacity: 1,592 litres (350 imp gal; 421 US gal)
- Operational range: 550 km (340 mi) on-road, 250 km (160 mi) off-road on internal fuel
- Maximum speed: 37 mph (59 km/h) on-road, 25 mph (40 km/h) off-road

The FV4034 Challenger 2 (MoD designation "CR2") is a third generation British main battle tank (MBT) in service with the armies of the United Kingdom, Oman, and Ukraine.

It was designed by Vickers Defence Systems (now Rheinmetall BAE Systems Land (RBSL)) as a private venture in 1986, and was an extensive redesign of the company's earlier Challenger 1 tank. The Ministry of Defence ordered a prototype in December 1988. The Challenger 2 has four crew members consisting of a commander, gunner, loader, and driver. The main armament is a L30A1 120-millimetre (4.7 in) rifled tank gun, an improved derivative of the L11 gun used on the Chieftain and Challenger 1. Fifty rounds of ammunition are carried for the main armament, alongside 4,200 rounds of 7.62 mm ammunition for the tank's secondary weapons: a L94A1 EX-34 chain gun mounted coaxially, and a L37A2 (GPMG) machine gun. The turret and hull are protected with second generation Chobham armour, also known as Dorchester. Powered by a Perkins CV12-6A V12 diesel engine, the tank has a range of 550 kilometres (340 mi) and maximum road speed of 59 kilometres per hour (37 mph).

The Challenger 2 eventually completely replaced the Challenger 1 in British service. In June 1991, the UK ordered 140 vehicles, followed by a further 268 in 1994; these were delivered between 1994 and 2002. The tank entered operational service with the British Army in 1998 and has since been used in Bosnia and Herzegovina, Kosovo and Iraq. To date, at least three Challenger 2 tanks are confirmed to have been destroyed in operations; the first was by accidental friendly fire from another Challenger 2 in Basra in 2003, and the two others were during the Russo-Ukrainian War, where the tanks were destroyed under Ukrainian control during the 2023 Ukrainian counteroffensive and Ukrainian incursion into Kursk. Further Russian claims with supporting drone footage show FPV drone strikes on at least two other vehicles. The extent of damage to them is unknown as of the time of writing. (Note: Donated to Ukraine by the United Kingdom in early 2023)

Challenger 2 tanks were also ordered by Oman in the 1990s with delivery of 38 vehicles being completed in 2001. A number of British Challenger 2 tanks were delivered to Ukraine in 2023.

Since the Challenger 2 entered service in 1998, various upgrades have sought to improve its protection, mobility and lethality. This has culminated in an upgraded design, known as Challenger 3, which is set to gradually replace Challenger 2 from 2027.

== History ==
=== Challenger 1 ===
The Challenger 2 is the third vehicle of this name, the first being the A30 Challenger, a World War II design using the Cromwell tank chassis with a 17-pounder gun. The second was the Persian Gulf War era Challenger 1, which was the British army's main battle tank (MBT) from the early 1980s to the early 2000s.

While the British Chieftain was heavily armed and armoured, its engine and suspension were considerably subpar compared to its contemporaries, leading to poor cross-country performance and a lack of maneuverability.

Some work on further development of the Chieftain had been ongoing since 1968 at the Military Vehicles and Engineering Establishment (MVEE), and several experimental vehicles produced, including one with the recently developed Chobham armour. In September 1978, it was announced that these concepts would be brought together in a new design, MBT-80. Deliveries of the MBT-80 were not expected until the mid-1980s at a minimum. Advances in Soviet armour, especially the apparent upcoming introduction of the T-80, suggested that the UK's tanks would be at a significant disadvantage before the MBT-80 would arrive. After considerable debate, MBT-80 was controversially cancelled, due to high projected costs, significant development delay, and the British military industry being reliant on Iran, which cancelled all orders due to the Iranian Revolution. Instead, in 1978, the British Army ordered the Challenger 1, based on the Shir 2. The final Challenger 1 was delivered to the British Army in 1990.

=== Challenger 2 contest ===
As Challenger production ramped up the government was interested in marketing it to its traditional customers like Jordan. To improve its sales prospects, the tank was entered in the 1987 running of the Canadian Army Trophy for tank performance, which had historically been won many times by British Army or Canadian Army units in British tanks. In this run, however, the Challenger performed very poorly, with its units ending up at the bottom of the rankings. While this performance was dismissed by the Ministry of Defence, including in comments in the House of Commons, it was a serious blow to its sales prospects. It also proved only marginally more reliable than the Chieftain, which was considered unreliable and a maintenance problem in the field, and the lack of significant improvement was much to the annoyance of the British Army.

Vickers began considering improvements under the Improved Challenger name in November 1986. They presented their work to the Ministry of Defence (MoD) in March 1987. In February 1988, the MoD issued Staff Requirement 4026, or the Chieftain Replacement Programme, which called for a new design to replace those Chieftains still in service. This program compared the American Abrams (as the XM1 was now known), French Leclerc and German Leopard 2, as well as Vickers's Improved Challenger. Initial studies by the British Army invariably selected the Leopard 2, which was protected as well as Challenger but had much better mobility and used the smoothbore 120 mm gun that would give it commonality with other NATO forces. The second choice was the Abrams, in second due largely to concerns with its fuel use.

After some supportive lobbying by Baron Young, the Thatcher government chose to proceed with the Vickers entry in December 1988, giving it the official name Challenger 2.

=== Prototypes ===
Vickers received a £90 million contract for a demonstrator vehicle to be delivered by September 1990. Part of this proof-of-concept phase was the demonstration that a depleted uranium projectile and more powerful gunpowder charge could be developed for the updated "CHARM" 120 mm gun developed at Royal Ordnance, which would give it capability against the latest Soviet designs. The demonstration phase had three milestones for progress, with dates of September 1989, March 1990, and September 1990. At the last of these milestones, Vickers was to have met 11 key criteria for the tank's design.

The demonstration phase was generally successful; the major design was completed by August 1989, and production of a series of nine prototypes began. These were largely complete August 1990, and the programme as a whole considered successfully completed on time in September. By this point, the Gulf War had started and Challenger 1 was sent to Iraq, where it performed far better than its initial showing would suggest, including performing several very long range kills against Iraqi armour, including one at over 5 kilometres (3.1 mi) range. This performance bolstered the MoD's confidence in British armour.

=== Production and delivery ===
In June 1991 the decision to buy Challenger 2 was made formal with a £520 million contract for 127 tanks and 13 driver training tanks. Production began in 1993 at two primary sites (Elswick, Tyne and Wear; and Barnbow, Leeds) with over 250 subcontractors involved. It was formally accepted on 16 May 1994 with the first tanks delivered in July 1994. An order for a further 259 tanks and 9 driver trainers worth £800 million was placed in July. The Challenger 2 failed its acceptance trials in 1994, and it was forced into the Progressive Reliability Growth Trial in 1995. Three vehicles were tested for 285 simulated battlefield days.

Due to downsizing of the Army after the end of the Cold War, the two runs of Challenger 2 would result in enough tanks to arm the entire Army, as opposed to the mixture of Challenger 1 and 2 that was formerly planned. This made the Challenger 1 surplus, and these were eventually shipped to Jordan for free. Vickers struggled to market the tank for export. Its one success led to Oman ordering 38 Challenger 2s; 18 in June 1993 and a further 20 in November 1997. Both batches ordered by Oman contain notable differences from the UK version: a larger cooling group and rear towing eyes, running gear and bazooka plates similar to Challenger 1, and a loader's Browning 0.5 Calibre M2 Heavy Machine Gun. Deliveries of Challenger 2 to Oman were completed in 2001.

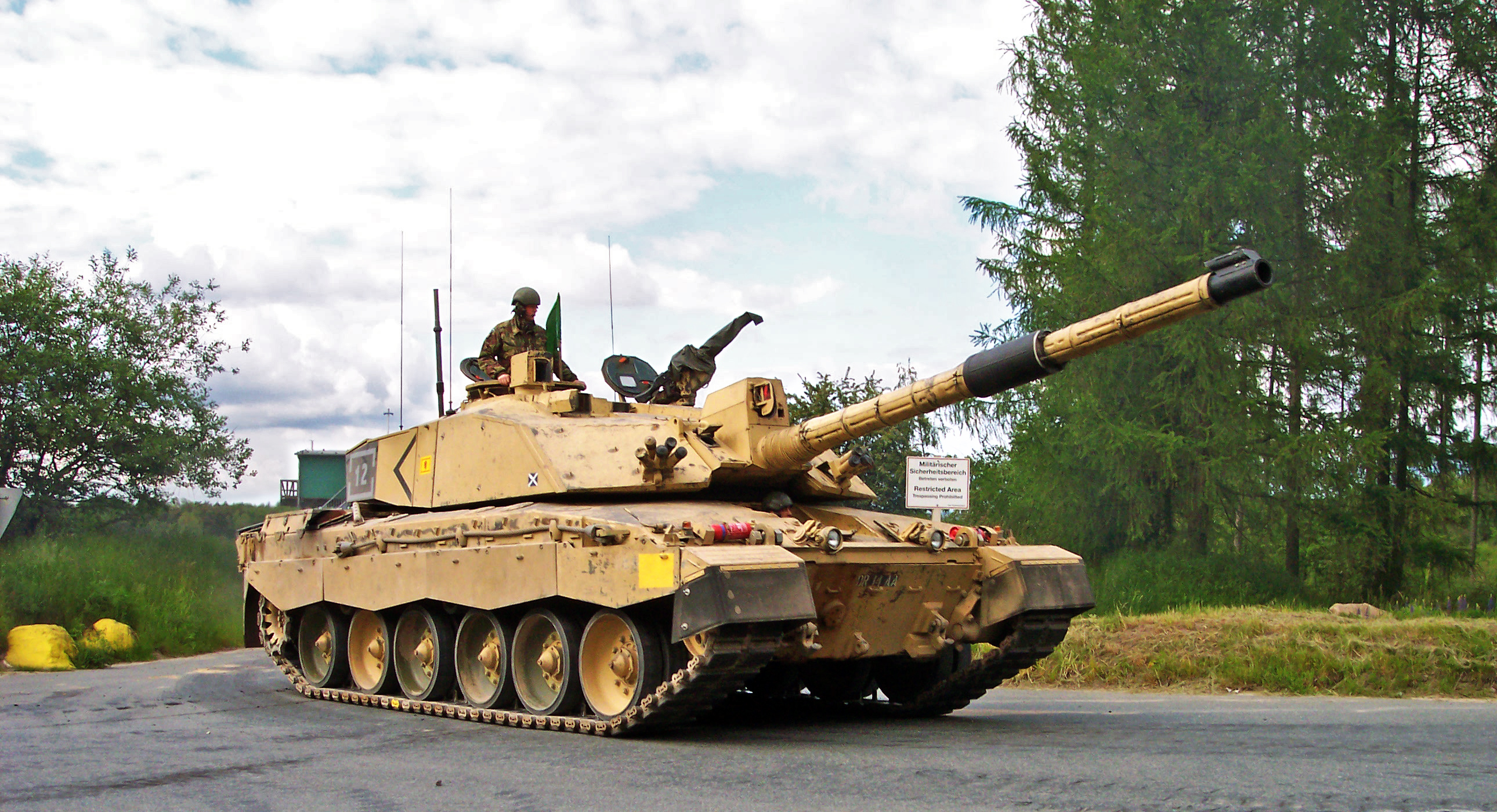
A Challenger 2 Tank of the Royal Scots Dragoon Guards (Squadron D) during live fire training exercises on Bergen-Hohne Training Area (Germany)

The tank was then accepted into service in 1998. An equally important milestone was the In-Service Reliability Demonstration (ISRD) in 1998. The CR2 In-Service Reliability Demonstration (ISRD) milestone was successfully achieved in January 1999. The ISRD took place from September to December 1998. Twelve fully crewed tanks were tested at the Bovington test tracks and the Lulworth Bindon ranges. The tank exceeded all staff requirements.

=== Later developments and possible replacement ===
The Challenger 2 entered service with the Royal Scots Dragoon Guards, with the last delivered in 2002. After the Army 2020 restructuring, only three Challenger 2 Tank Regiments will remain: the Queen's Royal Hussars, the King's Royal Hussars and the Royal Tank Regiment, each of which is the tank regiment of an Armoured Infantry Brigade. A single Army Reserve regiment, The Royal Wessex Yeomanry, will provide reservist Challenger crews to the regular regiments.

The Trojan minefield breaching vehicle and the Titan bridge-laying vehicle based on the chassis of the Challenger 2 were shown in November 2006. 66 are to be supplied by BAE Systems to the Royal Engineers, at a cost of £250 million.

A British military document from 2001 indicated that the British Army would not procure a replacement for the Challenger 2 because of a lack of foreseeable conventional threats in the future. However, IHS Jane's 360 reported in September 2015 that following discussions with senior Army officers and procurement officials at DSEI 2015 and the head of the British Army, General Sir Nick Carter, that the British Army was looking at either upgrading the Challenger 2 or outright replacing it. Sources confirmed that the future of the MBT was being considered at the highest levels of the Army.

This stemmed from the British Army's concern about the new Russian T-14 Armata main battle tank and the growing ineffectiveness of the ageing L30 rifled gun and the limited types of ammunition supported. It was confirmed that numerous armoured vehicle manufacturers had discussions with the MoD about a potential replacement for the Challenger 2. Shortly after, the British Army decided that purchasing a new tank would be too expensive, and chose to proceed with the Challenger 2 Life Extension Project (LEP). The Challenger 2 is expected to remain in service until 2025.

Between 2010 and 2014, 43 Challenger 2 tanks were disposed of as "beyond any economic repair".

The maintenance contract was let sometime in 2021. As of 2022 maintenance and overhaul of the Challenger 2 is undertaken by the Babcock Defence Support Group. Design authority for the tank is held by Rheinmetall BAE Systems Land (RBSL). Engineering work is to be completed by RBSL and integration work by Babcock. This complicated two-part project is detailed below. The initial operating capability for the upgraded Challenger 3 tanks is expected by 2027.

In May 2021, the UK MoD published a command paper entitled Defence in a Competitive Age. In it, the MoD proposed to retire 79 tanks from the current fleet of 227, with the remaining 148 vehicles upgraded to Challenger 3 status.

In September 2026, the army announced it was cutting back on training including exercises involving tanks, and prioritising training informed by lessons from Ukraine such as drone warfare.

=== Supply to Ukraine ===
After the Russian invasion of Ukraine in 2022, the then British Prime Minister, Boris Johnson, declined Ukrainian requests for Challenger 2 tanks to be part of the military aid packages arranged by the United Kingdom and other NATO countries. British Defence Secretary Ben Wallace had said that the idea "wouldn't work". In April 2022, Johnson and his German counterpart Olaf Scholz stated that both Western European allies would withhold their MBTs from the war. Johnson instead chose to deploy British Challenger 2 tanks to Poland to backfill the Polish Army, allowing the Polish government to donate Soviet-era T-72s to Ukraine.

On 14 January 2023, the British government confirmed reports that in light of the developing situation in Ukraine, it had reversed its position on the supply of Challenger 2 tanks to Ukraine. An initial commitment of 14 vehicles was announced, alongside 30 AS-90 155 mm self-propelled guns, and armoured repair and recovery vehicles. A spokesperson for the British Prime Minister, Rishi Sunak, described the move as reflecting "the UK's ambition to intensify support". These tanks were the first Western MBTs offered to Ukraine, supplementing donations of Western manufactured infantry fighting vehicles, armoured personnel carriers, and self-propelled artillery; A number of other countries have subsequently announced that they would supply Ukraine with Western-manufactured MBTs; specifically the American M1 Abrams and German-made Leopard 1 and Leopard 2.

On 29 January 2023, the UK Ministry of Defence announced that the first Ukrainian troops had arrived in the UK to begin training on Challenger 2. On 8 February, Sunak and Ukrainian President Volodymyr Zelenskyy paid a visit to Ukrainian soldiers at Lulworth Camp where they were being trained on Challenger 2 tanks by British soldiers from the Royal Tank Regiment and the Queen's Royal Hussars. Sunak used the opportunity to reaffirm the British intention to have the first Challenger 2 tanks delivered to Ukraine by March 2023.

On 27 March 2023, the UK Ministry of Defence announced that Ukrainian tank crews had completed their training in the UK on Challenger 2 tanks, and had returned to Ukraine.

On 18 August 2023 a picture of a Challenger 2 in Ukraine was released on Twitter. Unique modifications include top-mounted slat armour believed to be used to stop drone attacks.

On 4 September 2023, a video emerged from Robotyne which showed the first combat loss of the Challenger 2 tank.

During the Ukrainian incursion into Kursk, three more Challenger 2 tanks were visually confirmed to have been damaged with at least one vehicle destroyed.

== Design ==
=== Armament ===
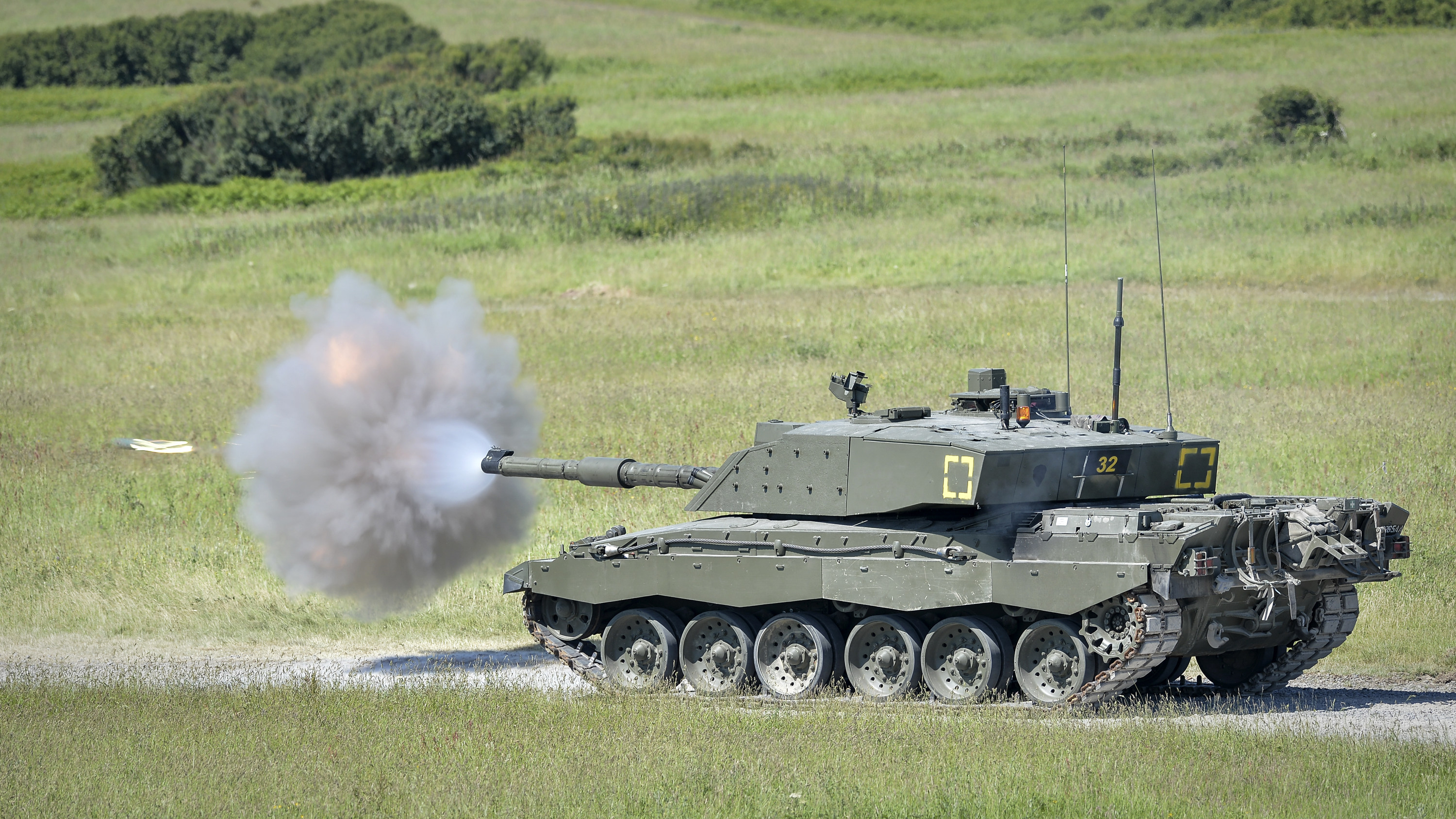
A Challenger 2 firing its main armament during an exercise. The shell is visible to the left of the smoke cloud.

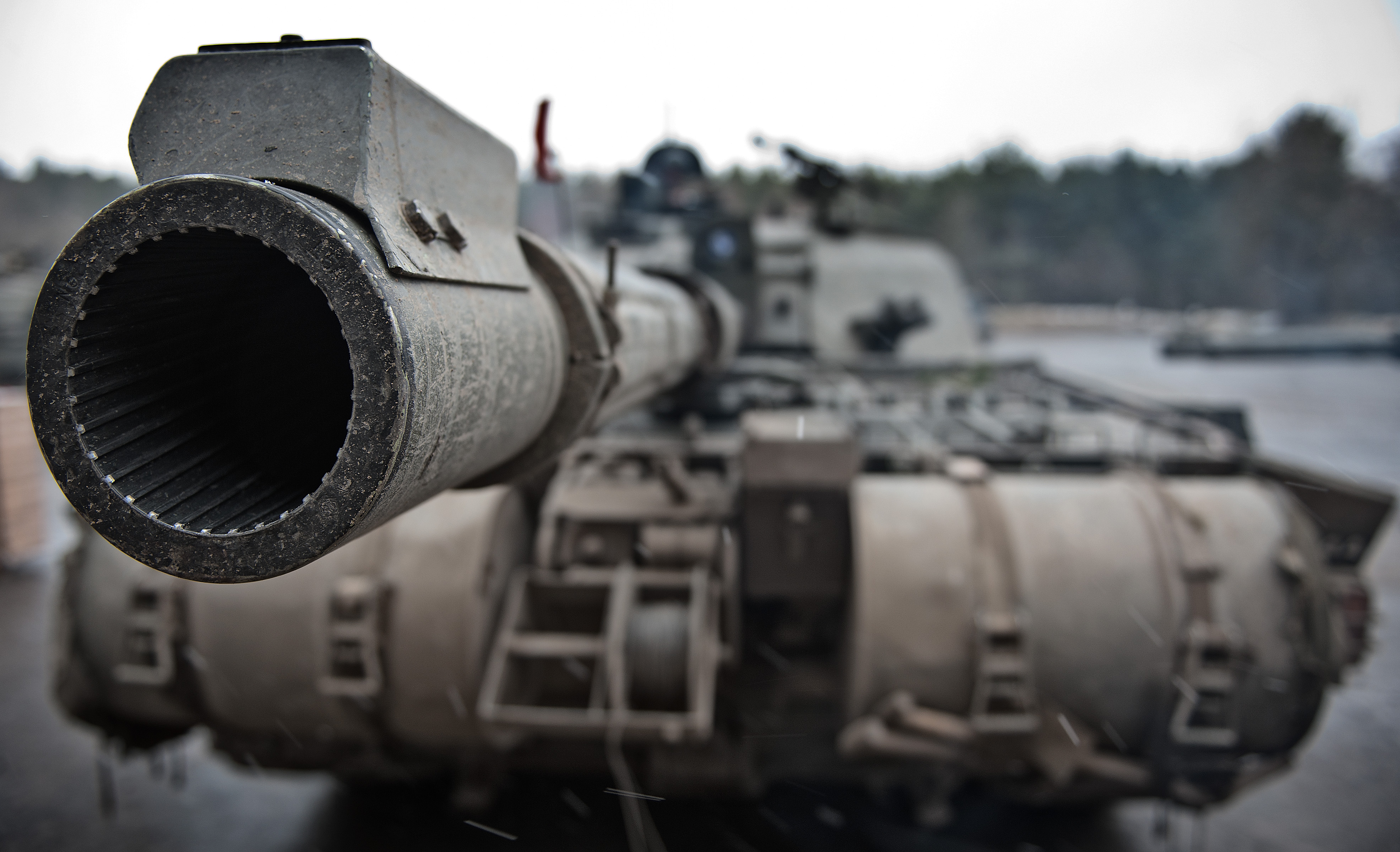
Close-up of muzzle showing rifling

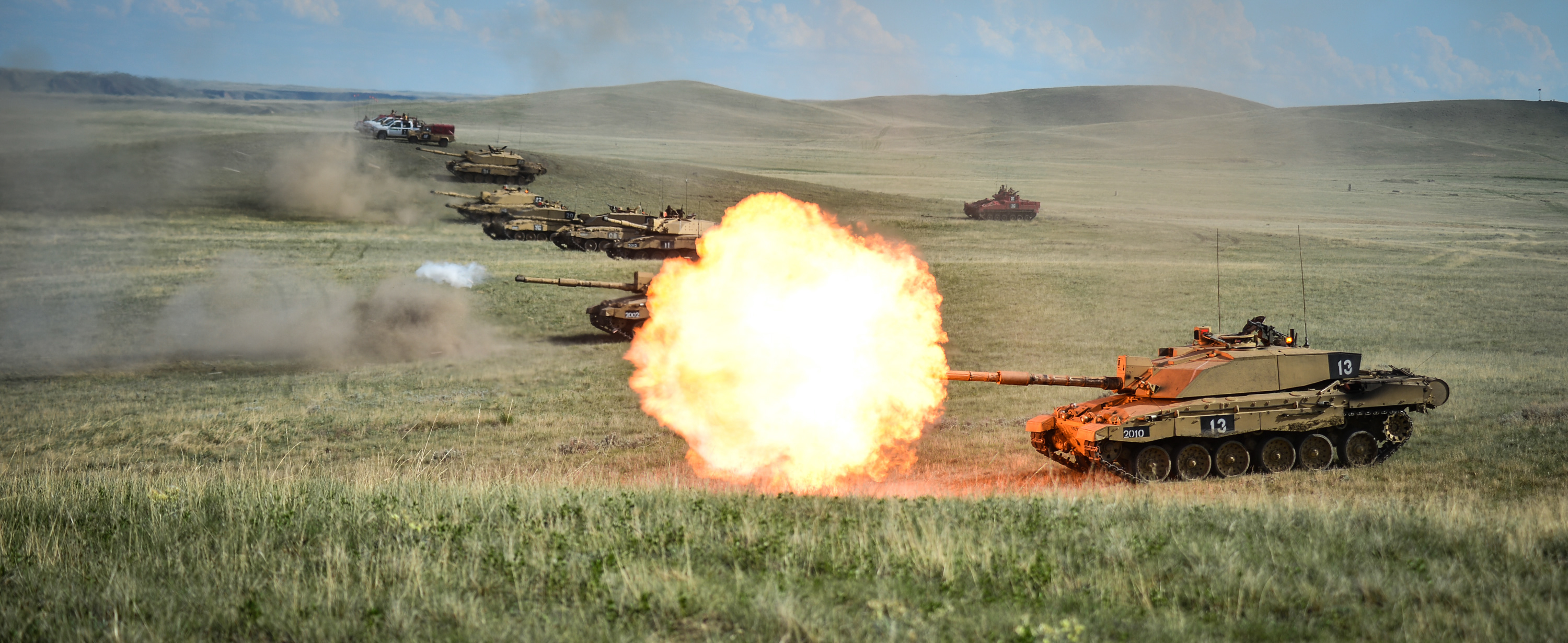
A row of Challenger 2 tanks on a firing range at BATUS, Canada

The Challenger 2 is equipped with a 120-millimetre (4.7 in) 55-calibre long L30A1 tank gun, the successor to the L11 gun used on Chieftain and Challenger 1. The gun is made from high strength electro-slag remelting (ESR) steel with a chromium alloy lining. Like earlier British 120 mm guns, it is insulated by a thermal sleeve. It is fitted with a muzzle reference system and fume extractor, and is controlled by an all-electric control and stabilisation system. The turret has a rotation time of 9 seconds through 360 degrees.

Uniquely among NATO main battle tank guns, the L30A1 is rifled and along with its predecessor, the Royal Ordnance L11A5, the only Third Generation Main Battle Tank Guns to use a rifled barrel. This is because the British Army continues to place a premium on the use of high explosive squash head (HESH) rounds in addition to armour-piercing fin-stabilized discarding-sabot (APFSDS) rounds. HESH rounds have a longer range (up to 8 kilometres or 5 miles further) than APFSDS, and are more effective against buildings and thin-skinned vehicles.

Forty-nine main armament rounds are carried in the turret and hull. These are a mix of L27A1 APFSDS (also referred to as CHARM 3), L31 HESH and L34 white phosphorus smoke rounds, depending on the situation. As with earlier versions of the 120 mm gun, the propellant charges are loaded separately from the shell or KE projectile. A combustible rigid charge is used for the APFSDS rounds and a combustible hemicylindrical bag charge for the HESH and smoke rounds. An electrically fired vent tube is used to initiate firing of the main armament rounds. The main armament ammunition is described to be "three-part ammunition", consisting of the projectile, charge and vent tube. The separation of ammunition pieces aids in ensuring lower chances of unfired ammunition detonating prematurely.

The Challenger 2 is also armed with a L94A1 EX-34 7.62 mm chain gun coaxially to the left of the main gun, and a 7.62 mm L37A2 (GPMG) machine gun mounted on a pintle on the loader's hatch ring; 4,200 rounds of 7.62 mm ammunition are carried. The Challenger can also mount a Leonardo "Enforcer" remote control weapons system, bearing a 7.62 mm L37A2 (GPMG) machine gun, a 12.7 mm heavy machine gun or a 40 mm automatic grenade launcher.

=== Fire control and sights ===
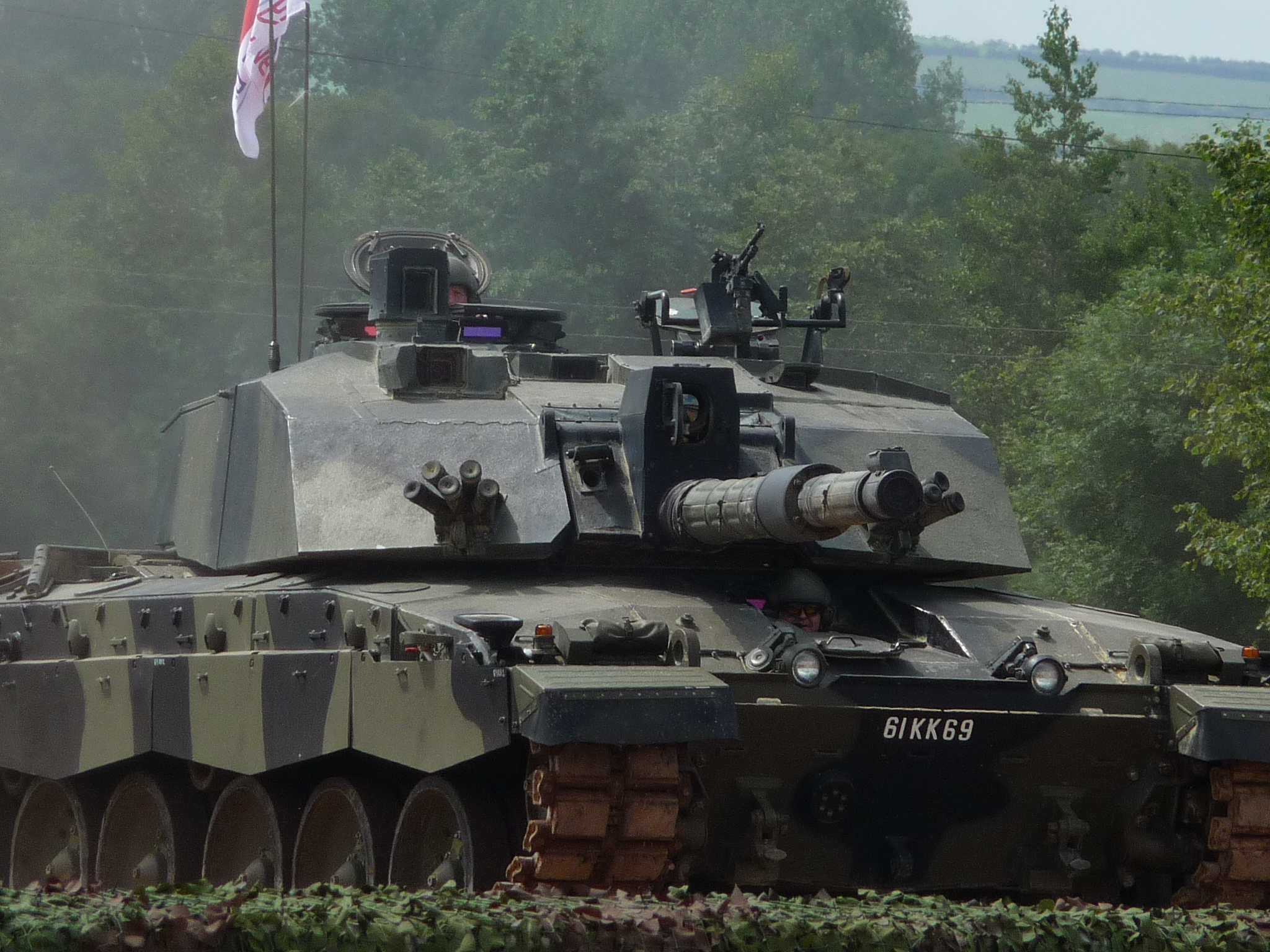
A close up view of a Challenger 2

The digital fire control computer from Computing Devices Co of Canada contains two 32-bit processors with a MIL STD1553B databus. It has capacity for additional systems, such as a Battlefield Information Control System.

The commander has a panoramic SAGEM VS 580-10 gyrostabilised sight with laser rangefinder. The elevation range is +35° to −35°. The commander's station is equipped with eight periscopes for 360° vision.

The Thermal Observation and Gunnery Sight II (TOGS II), from Thales, provides night vision. The thermal image is displayed on both the gunner's and commander's sights and monitors. The gunner has a stabilised primary sight using a laser rangefinder, with a range of 200 m (660 ft) to 10 km (6.2 mi). The driver's position is equipped with a Thales Optronics image-intensifying Passive Driving Periscope (PDP) for night driving and a rear view thermal camera.

=== Protection ===
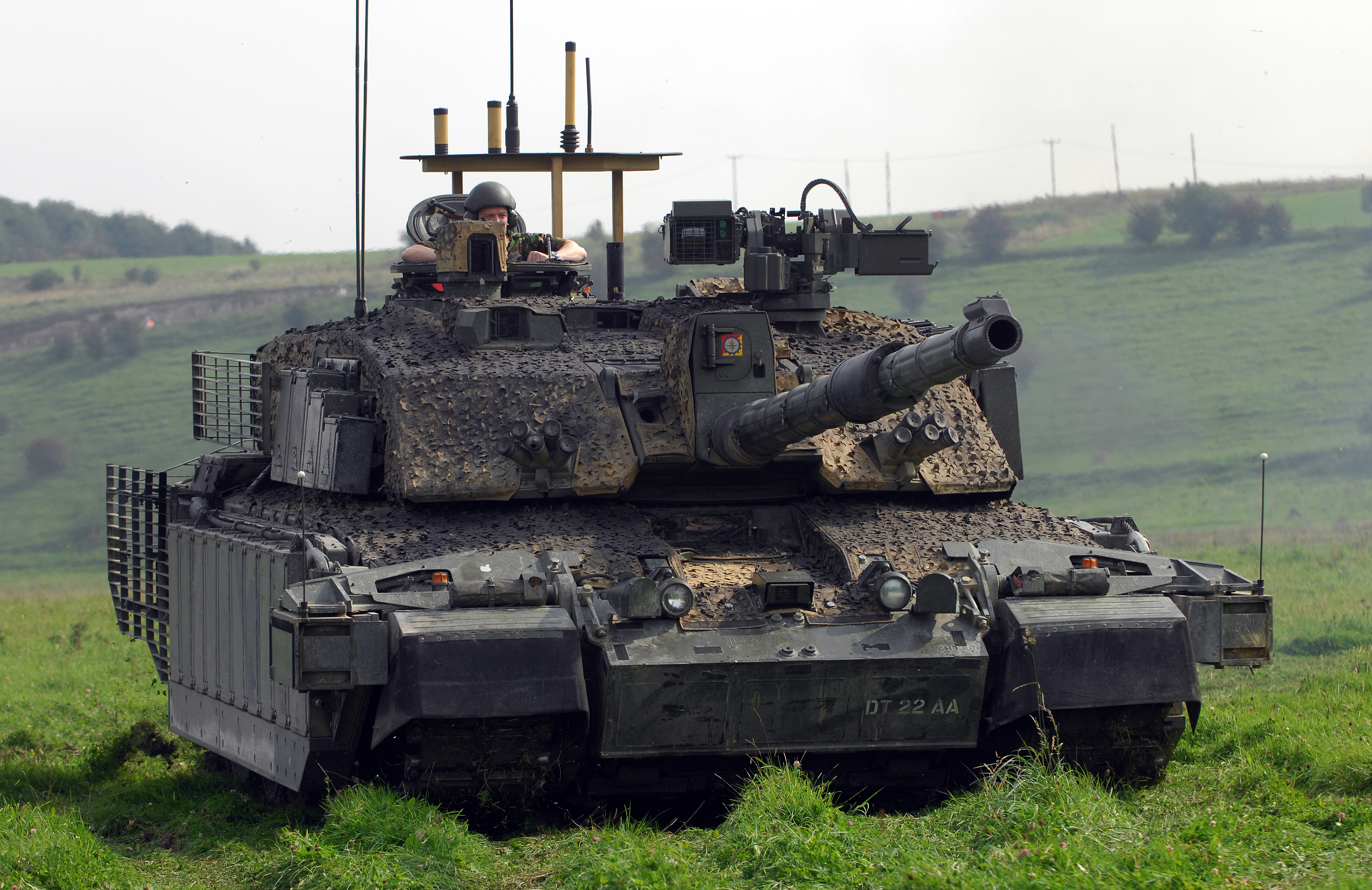
Challenger 2 with armour upgrades to the sides of the turret, skirts, bar armour to rear. Smoke grenade launchers visible on turret front. Counter-IED ECM antennas are on the platform on the turret, and additional ECM equipment overhangs the left and right front fenders. A remote controlled weapon systems (RCWS) has also been fitted to the turret.

The Challenger 2 is a heavily armoured and well protected tank. The turret and hull are protected by second-generation Chobham armour, also known as Dorchester, the details of which are classified but which is said to have a mass efficiency more than twice that of rolled homogeneous armour against high-explosive anti-tank (HEAT) projectiles. Crew safety was paramount in the design. It uses a solid state electric drive for turret and gun motion, instead of hydraulic systems that can leak fluid into the crew compartment.

Explosive reactive armour kits and additional bar armour may be fitted as needed. The nuclear, biological, and chemical (NBC) protection system is located in the turret bustle. The tank's shape is designed to minimise its radar signature. On each side of the turret are five L8 smoke grenade dischargers. The Challenger 2 can create smoke by injecting diesel fuel into the exhaust manifolds.

=== Drive system ===
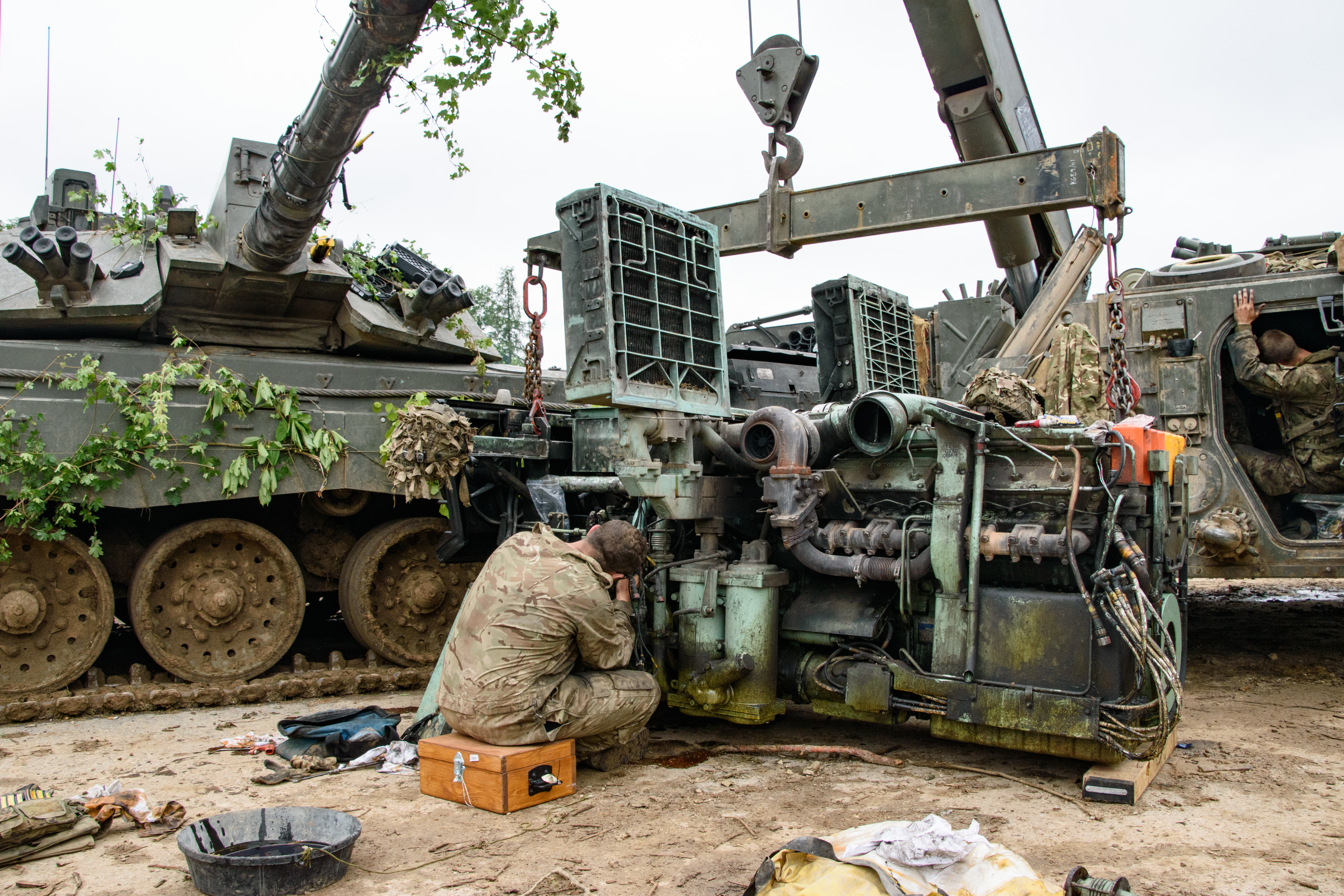
REME mechanic performing field maintenance on the power pack of a King's Royal Hussars Challenger 2.

The tank's drive system comprises:

- Engine: Perkins 26.1 litre, 60° vee, twin turbocharged, CV12-6A four-stroke, four-valve-per-cylinder (pushrod), direct-injection diesel engine delivering 1,200 bhp (890 kW) at 2300 rpm. Torque 4126 Nm at 1700 rpm. The engine and gearbox are controlled by a Petards Vehicle Integrated Control System (VICS).
- Gearbox: David Brown Santasalo TN54E epicyclical transmission (6 fwd, 2 rev.) rated at 1200 bhp and upgradable to 1500 bhp.
- Suspension: Horstman Defence Systems second-generation hydrogas suspension units (HSU).
- Track: William Cook Defence hydraulically adjustable TR60 414FS double-pin.
- Maximum speed: 37 mph (60 km/h) on road; 25 mph (40 km/h) cross country
- Range: 342 mi or 550 km on road with external fuel; 156 mi (250 km) cross country on internal fuel.

The tank is fitted with an Extel Systems Wedel auxiliary power unit, an APU, also referred to as a generating unit engine (GUE), based on a 38 kW Perkins P404C-22 diesel engine. It has a 600 A electrical output, which can be used to power the vehicle's electrical systems when it is stationary and the main engine is switched off. This replaces the Perkins P4.108 engine fitted when the tank was first introduced. The use of an APU allows fuel consumption to be reduced, and lowers the audio and thermal signature of the vehicle.

By 2013 the British Army had, at various events featuring the Challenger 2, begun to state the on-road range as 550 km as opposed to an earlier stated value of 450 km. They also publicly stated a maximum road speed of 59 km/h while equipped with 15 tons of additional modules.

=== Crew and accommodation ===
The British Army maintained its requirement for a four-man crew, including a loader, after risk analysis of the incorporation of an automatic loader suggested that autoloaders reduced battlefield survivability. Mechanical failure and the time required for repair were prime concerns.

Similar to every British tank since the Centurion, and most other British AFVs, Challenger 2 contains a boiling vessel (BV) for water, for use preparing and heating food and drink.

== Operational history ==
[The tank was] well armoured but in an operational theatre it's not the case that you can have absolute protection. This was not in any way new technology – the device involved was the same type of shaped charge that we have seen used very regularly. No one has ever said Challenger tanks are impenetrable. We have always said that a big enough bomb will defeat any armour and any vehicle.

— MoD spokesman, speaking in regard to the Challenger 2 in 2007

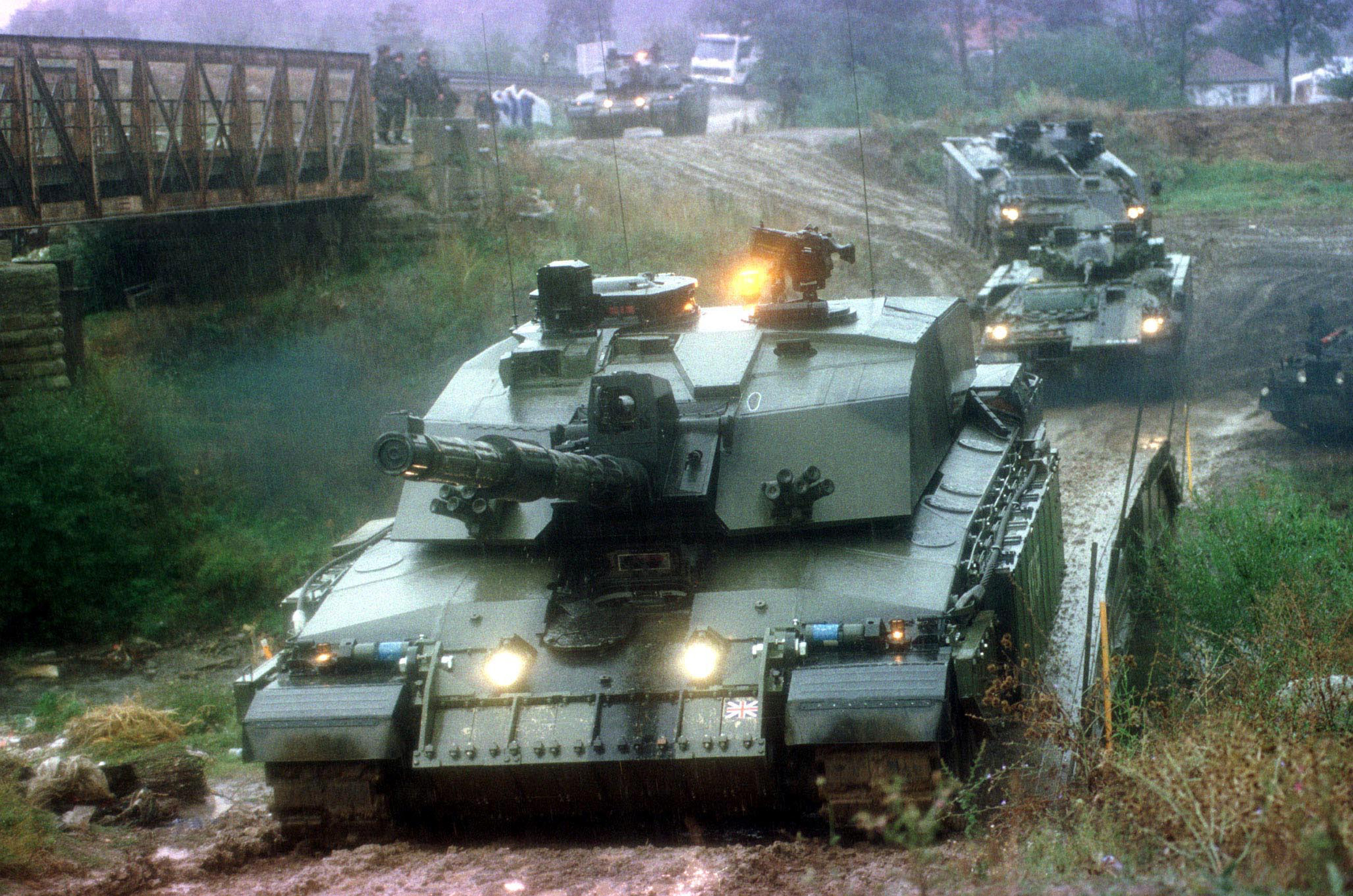
Challenger 2 tanks deployed in Kosovo, September 2000

=== Peacekeeping in the Balkans ===
The first operational deployments of Challenger 2 tanks were to support peacekeeping operations in Bosnia and Herzegovina and Kosovo.

=== Iraq War ===
Challenger 2 was first used in combat in March 2003 during the invasion of Iraq. The 120 tanks of 7th Armoured Brigade, part of 1st Armoured Division, went into action around Basra. The type saw extensive use during the siege of the city, providing fire support to the British forces and knocking out Iraqi tanks, mainly T-54/55s.

The tanks deployed to Iraq were "desertised" in an effort to avoid the difficulties that had been identified in Challenger 2 during Exercise Saif Sareea II in Oman 18 months earlier. The addition of sand filters and other modifications through a series of Urgent Operational Requirements substantially improved the platform's operational availability.

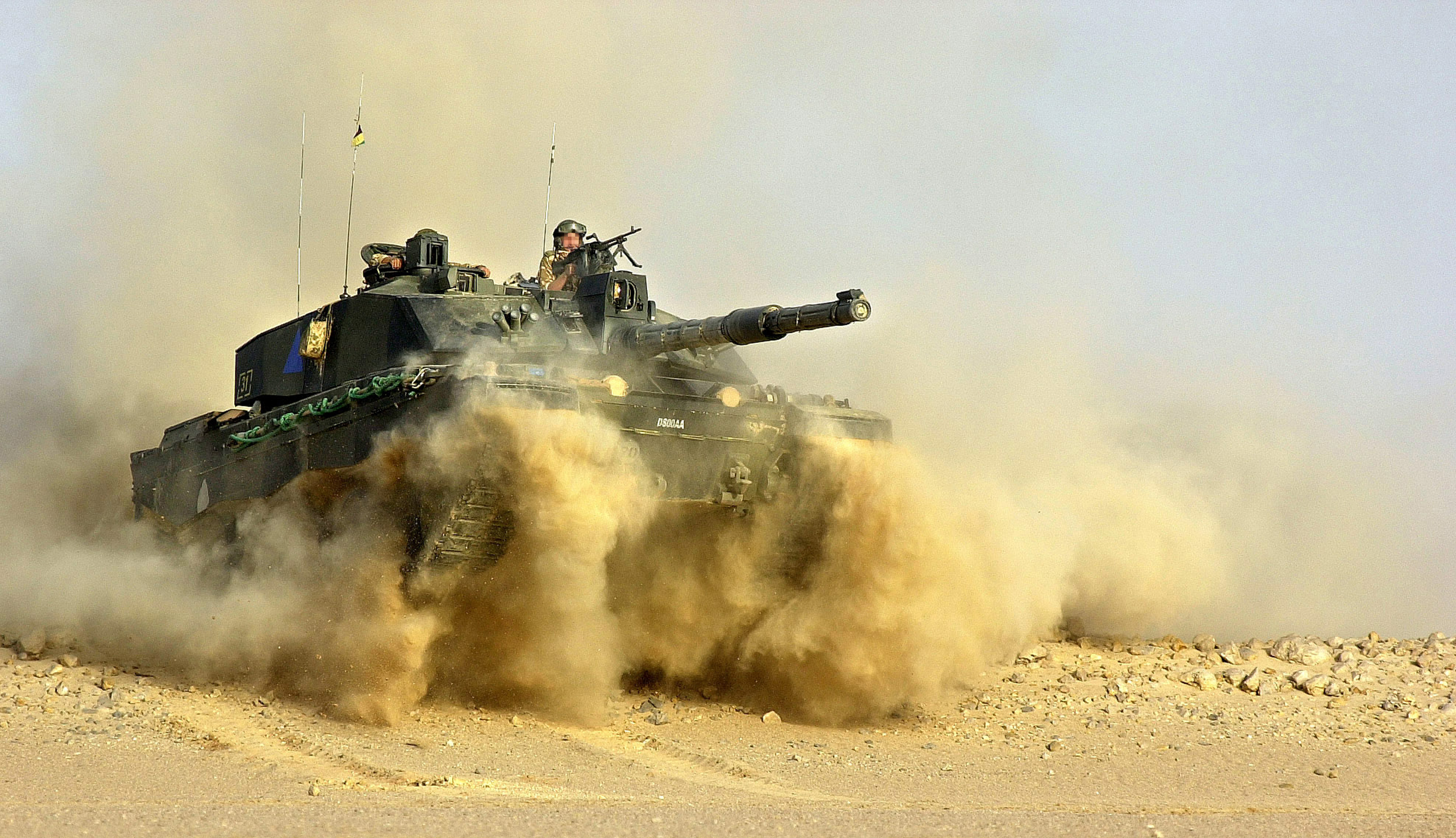
Challenger 2 in Oman during Exercise Saif Sareea II in September 2001

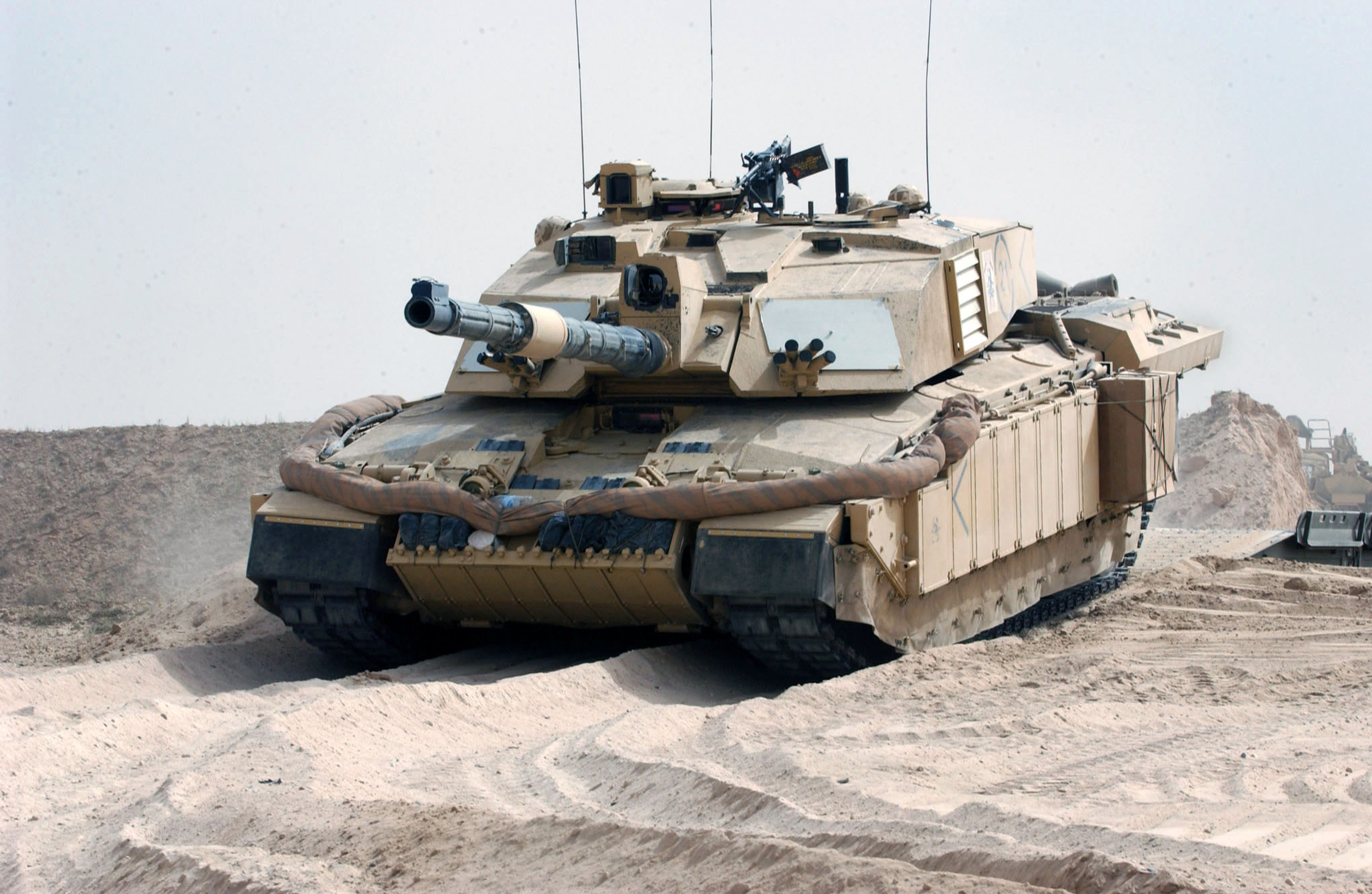
A Challenger 2 in Iraq, 2003

During the 2003 invasion of Iraq, the Challenger 2 tanks suffered no tank losses to Iraqi fire. In one encounter within an urban area, a Challenger 2 came under attack from irregular forces with machine guns and rocket propelled grenades (RPGs). The driver's sight was damaged and while attempting to back away under the commander's directions, the other sights were damaged and the tank threw its tracks entering a ditch. The crew survived, safe within the tank until it was recovered for repairs, the worst damage being to the sighting system. It was back in operation six hours later.

- 25 March 2003: A friendly fire ("blue-on-blue") incident in Basra in which one Challenger 2 of the Black Watch Battlegroup (2nd Royal Tank Regiment) mistakenly engaged another Challenger 2 of the Queen's Royal Lancers after detecting what was believed to be an enemy flanking manoeuvre on thermal equipment. The attacking tank's second HESH round hit the open commander's hatch lid of the QRL tank sending hot fragments into the turret, killing two crew members. The hit caused a fire that eventually ignited the stowed ammunition, destroying the tank. This was the first Challenger 2 to be destroyed on operations.
- August 2006: An RPG-29 capable of firing a tandem-charge penetrated the frontal lower underbelly armour of a Challenger 2 commanded by Captain Thomas Williams of The Queens's Royal Hussars south east of al-Amarah, southern Iraq. Its driver, Trooper Sean Chance, lost part of his foot in the blast; two more of the crew were slightly injured. Chance was able to reverse the vehicle 1.5 mi (2.4 km) to the regimental aid post despite his injuries. The incident was not made public until May 2007; in response to accusations that crews had been told the tank was impervious to the insurgents' weapons, the MoD said "We have never claimed that the Challenger 2 is impenetrable."
- 6 April 2007: In Basra, Iraq, a shaped charge from an improvised explosive device (IED) penetrated the underside of a tank resulting in the driver losing a leg and causing minor injuries to another soldier.

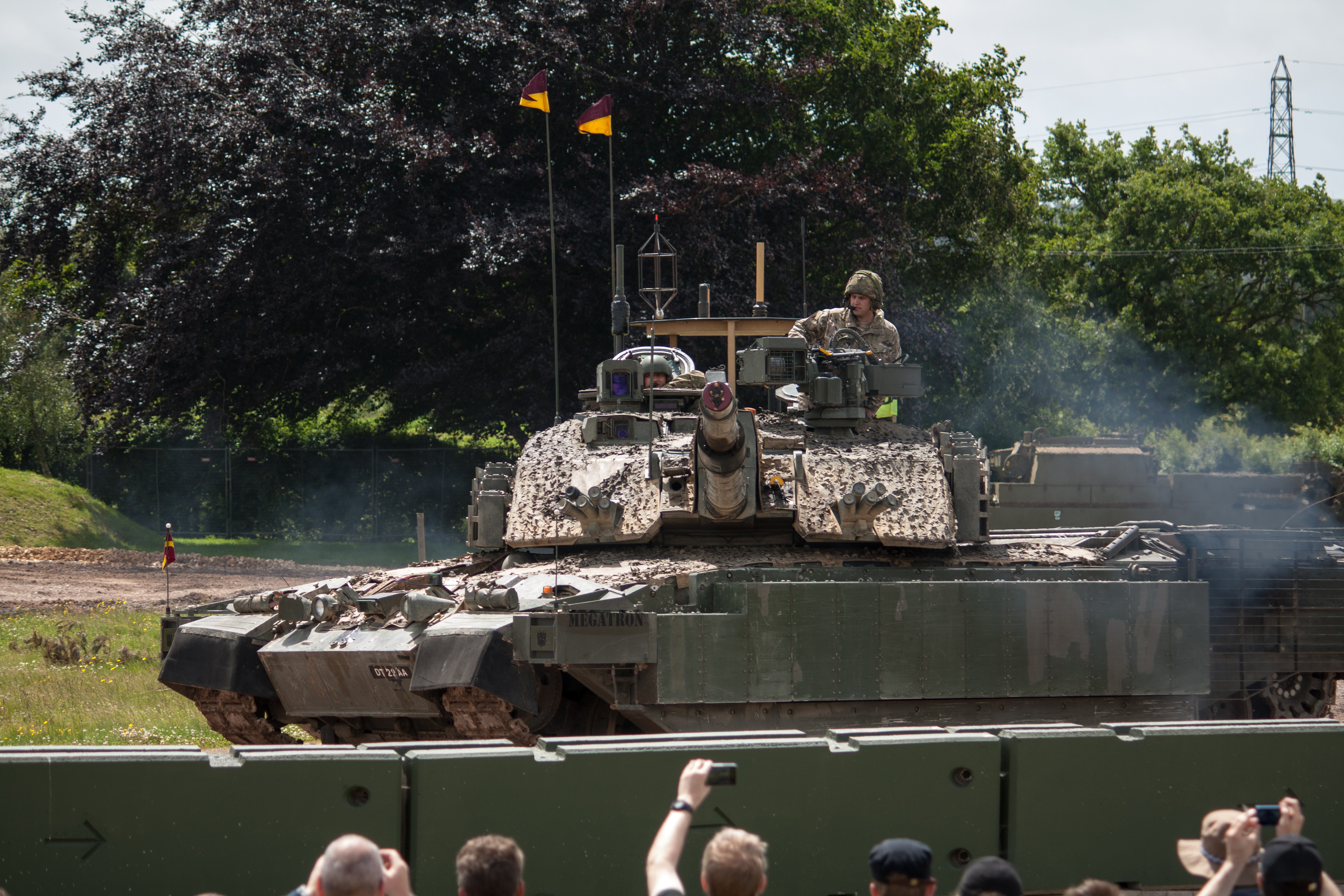
A Challenger 2 with added explosive reactive armour panels, manufactured by Rafael Advanced Defense Systems on display at The Tank Museum

To help prevent incidents of this nature, Challenger 2s have been upgraded with a new passive armour package, including the use of add-on armour manufactured by Rafael Advanced Defense Systems of Israel. When deployed on operations the Challenger 2 is now normally upgraded to Theatre Entry Standard (TES), which includes a number of modifications including armour and weapon system upgrades.

=== Operation Cabrit ===
Since 2017, the UK has regularly deployed Challenger 2 tanks, alongside Warrior Infantry Fighting Vehicles, to Estonia as part of Operation Cabrit. The two squadrons of tanks currently deployed, form part of the British contribution to the NATO Enhanced Forward Presence multinational battlegroup in the Baltics.

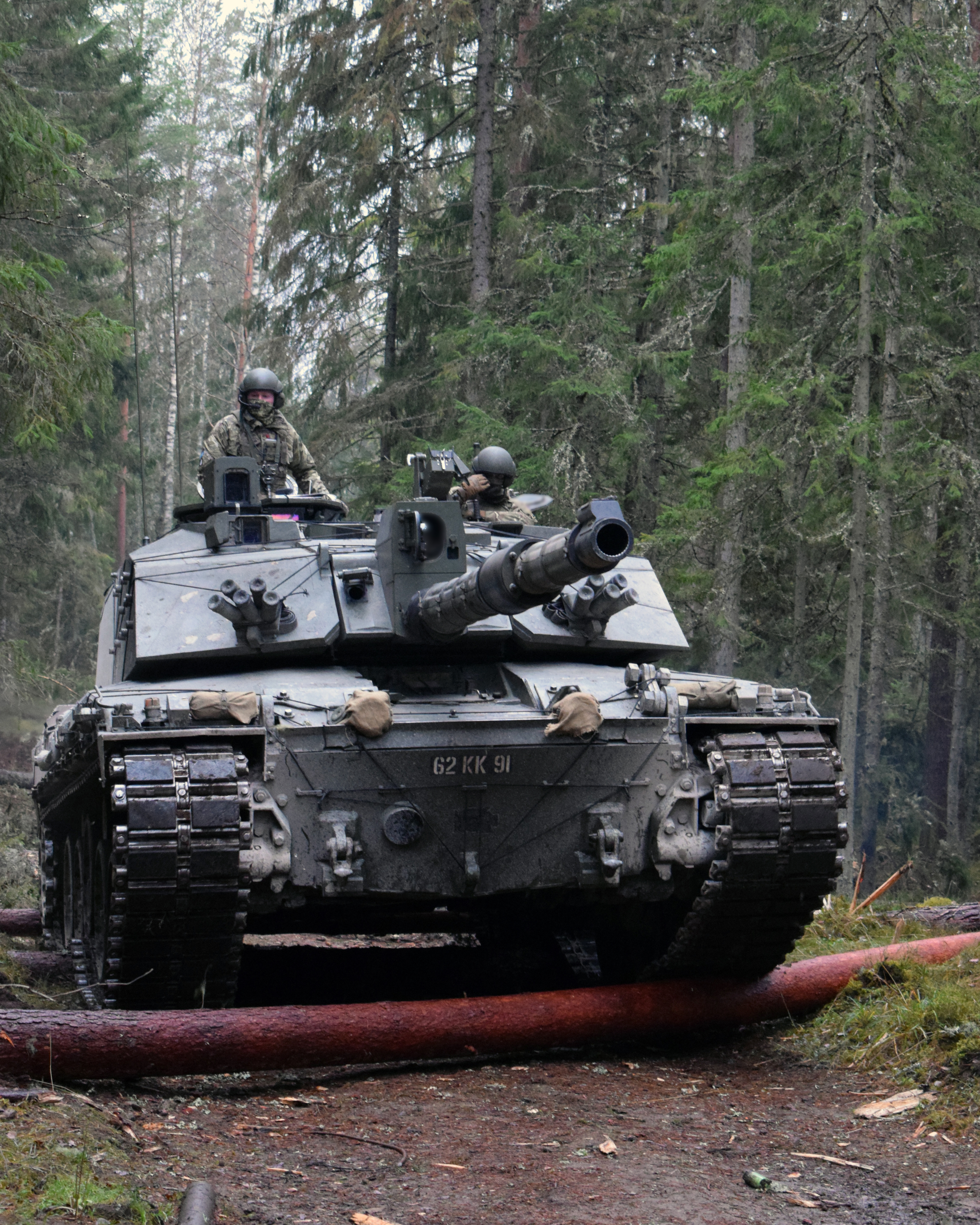
A Challenger 2 of the Queen's Royal Hussars on exercise in Estonia, November 2020

=== Russian invasion of Ukraine ===
In July 2022, a squadron of 14 Challenger 2 tanks of the Queen's Royal Hussars were sent to Poland on an initial 6-month deployment. The squadron is to be integrated into a Polish battlegroup under Polish command. The move is designed to 'backfill' Polish capability after Polish T-72 tanks were donated to Ukraine.

On 21 June 2023, the Ukrainian army released a video purportedly showing the Challenger 2 in Ukraine. The tanks are assigned to the 82nd Air Assault Brigade. In September 2023, Ukrainian Air Assault Forces Command published a video interview with a Ukrainian Challenger 2 crew member who stated that the tank was a "sniper rifle among tanks" due to its accuracy.

On 4 September 2023, a video emerged from Robotyne which showed the first combat loss of a Challenger 2 tank. A 9M133 Kornet missile triggered a fire that apparently cooked off the Challenger 2's ammunition charges, and the resulting blast wrenched the Challenger 2's turret from its hull.

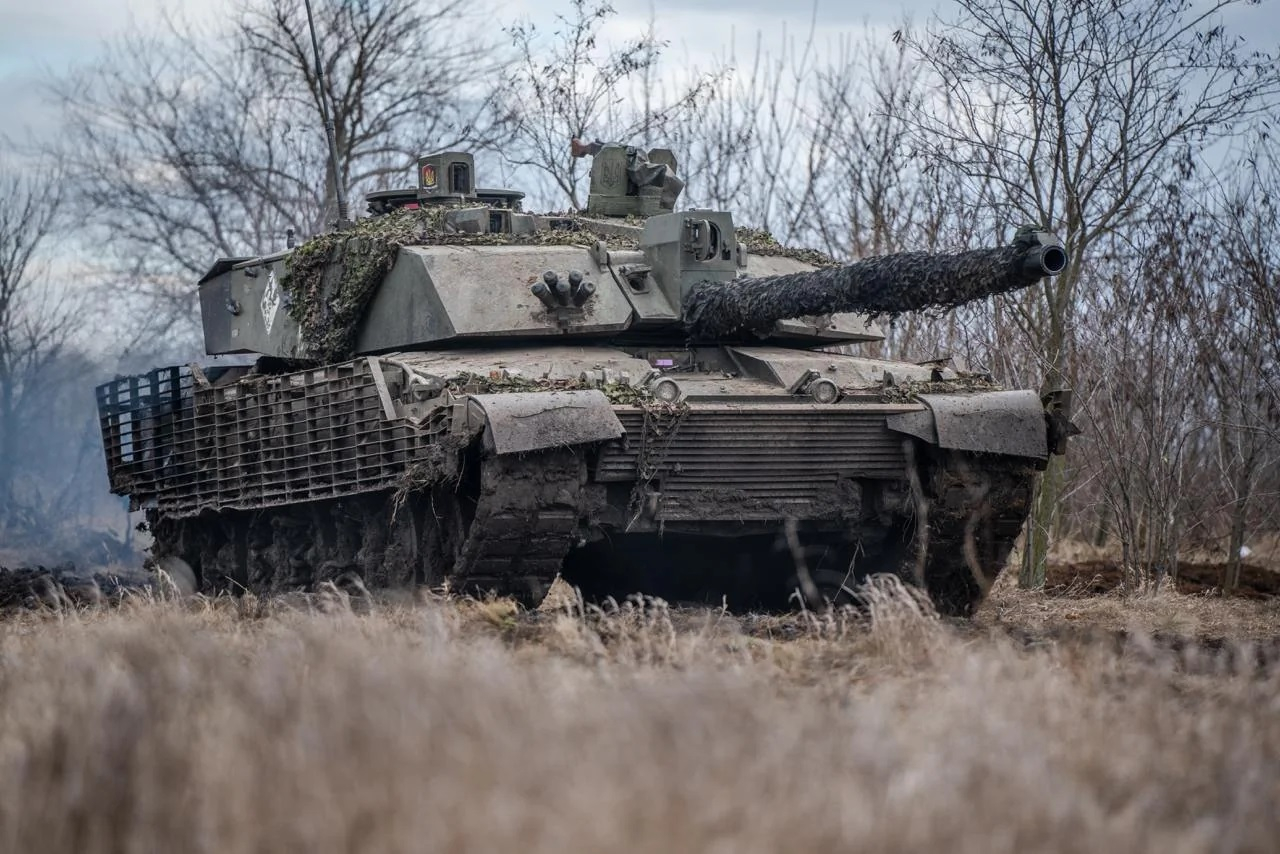
Ukrainian Challenger 2. 82nd Air Assault Brigade, 2024

According to Ukrainian media in 10 March 2024: two more Challenger 2s had been damaged and repaired; only 7 of 14 remain in combat-ready condition. It is often necessary to repair turret parts and the aiming system; the low level of readiness is due to delays getting parts for routine repairs. One Ukrainian Challenger 2 crew member said that the tank's 1,200-horsepower engine is under-powered for a 71-ton vehicle, and they often get bogged down in soft soil and need towing by other Challengers or engineering vehicles. While a smoothbore 120 mm L44 tank cannon has a useful life of up to 1,500 rounds, a rifled L30A1 wears out after only 500 rounds. In August 2024, British news media reported that Challenger 2 tanks were participating in Ukraine's Kursk Oblast incursion. During the incursion a Challenger 2 tank was destroyed by Russian forces using a Lancet loitering munition; this would be the second confirmed loss of the tank during the war. The third Challenger 2 tank was damaged on 14 November 2024 after a Russian FPV drone struck the driver's position while the tank was parked in a tree line. Russian sources claimed the vehicle was destroyed. A fourth Challenger 2 tank was damaged south of Malaya Loknya during the incursion on 5 January 2025 after a Russian FPV drone struck the gun mantlet. As with the third example, Russian sources claimed the vehicle as destroyed.

== Upgrades ==
=== CLIP ===
The Challenger Lethality Improvement Programme (CLIP) was a programme to replace the current L30A1 rifled gun with the smoothbore Rheinmetall 120 mm gun currently used in the Leopard 2 and M1 Abrams. The use of a smoothbore weapon would have allowed Challenger 2 to use NATO standard ammunition, including tungsten-based kinetic energy penetrators which do not have the same political and environmental objections as depleted uranium rounds. The production lines for rifled 120 mm ammunition in the UK have been closed for some years so existing stocks of ammunition for the L30A1 are finite.

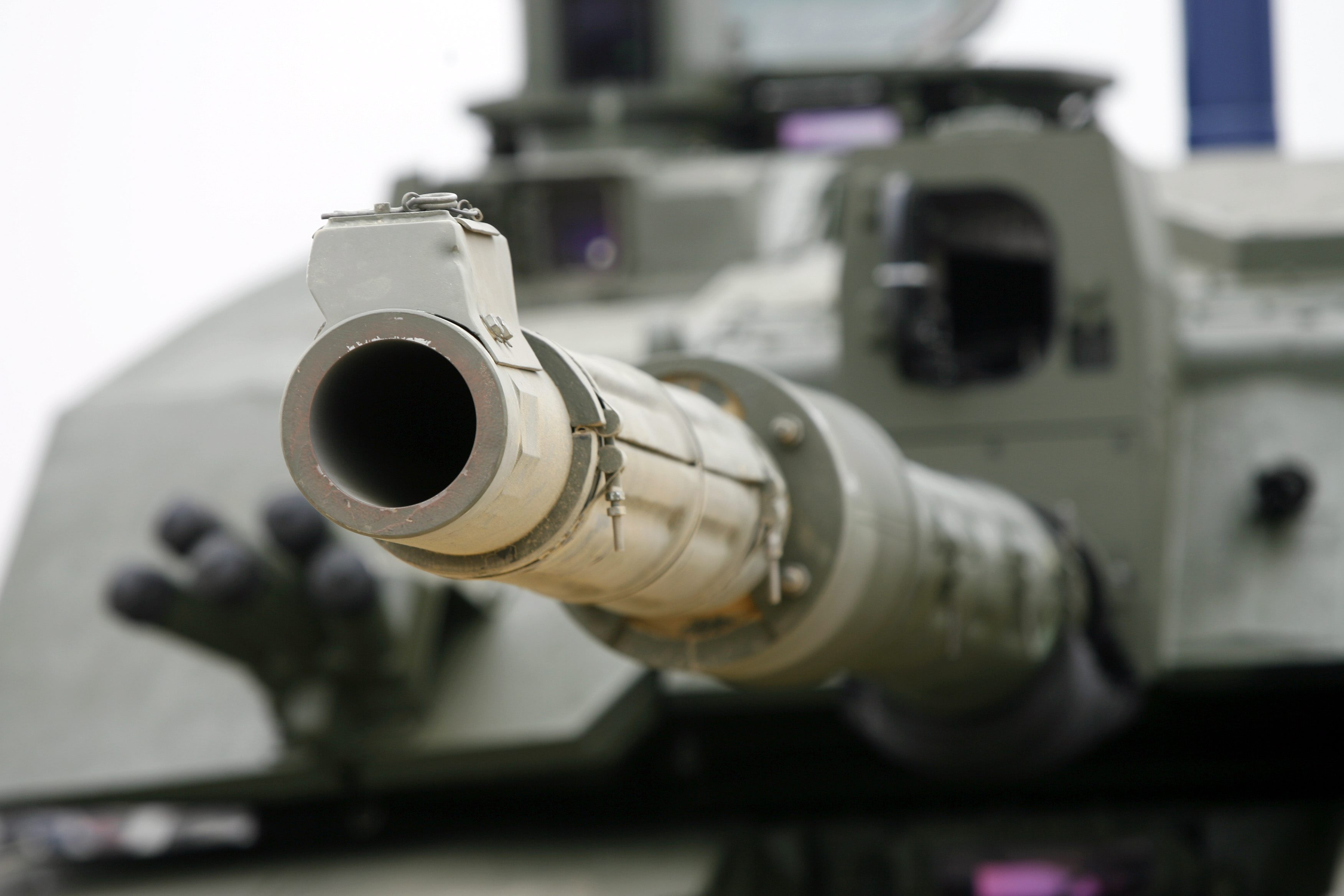
Challenger 2 fitted with 120 mm smoothbore gun for trials

A single Challenger 2 was fitted with the L55 and underwent trials in January 2006. The smoothbore gun was the same length as the L30A1 and was fitted with the rifled gun's cradle, thermal sleeve, bore evacuator and muzzle reference system. Early trials apparently revealed that the German tungsten DM53 round was more effective than the depleted uranium CHARM 3. The ammunition storage and handling arrangements had to be changed to cater for the single-piece smoothbore rounds, instead of the separate-loading rifled rounds. Other improvements were also considered, including a regenerative NBC protection system.

=== HAAIP ===
Updates to the automotive components of Challenger 2 are being undertaken as part of the ongoing Heavy Armour Automotive Improvement Programme (HAAIP), which is expected to continue until 2031, and expected to align with the Challenger 3 programme. The HAAIP programme "will be made to existing in-service Challenger 2 tanks to increase their mobility and stability, both of which are critical to providing the foundation for the new turret and systems that will upgrade the vehicle to a Challenger 3."

HAAIP has already led to upgrades to the air filtration system, through the use of cleanable air filters with increased operating life, which were tested in Exercise Saif Sareea 3 in October 2018. The HAAIP programme, awarded to BAE Systems, was intended to apply a common engine and suspension standard to Challenger 2, the DTT, CRARRV, Titan and Trojan, improving reliability. However the Minister of State for Defence announced in April 2022 that a common engine (build standard) will be applied to Challenger 2, Challenger 3 and CRARRV only after a new refrigerant is found for the CTCS (Crew Temperature Control System).

In terms of the powertrain, BAE Systems were evaluating whether to uprate the existing CV12 engine or swap this for alternative designs. The proposed CV12 upgrade by Caterpillar Defense would fit electronically controlled common rail fuel injection and introduce engine health monitoring (HUMS). This would increase the maximum power output from 1,200 bhp (at 2,300 rpm) to 1,500 bhp (at 2,400 rpm), reduce battlefield smoke emissions, and improve fleet reliability and availability. Since this information was released (February 2019) no further information in the public domain has been released regarding fitting Common Rail Fuel Injection and HUMS. The engines and transmission units have themselves also been remanufactured in recent years, with parts and equipment also purchased to convert CV12-6A engines to CV12-8A build standard. Publications in support of tender procurement for HAAIP indicate that a new CV12-9A engine build standard will be used for the Challenger 2s upgraded to become Challenger 3s, and for CRARRV.

Work to update the base Challenger 2 hull and automotive components, undertaken by DE&S, RBSL and Babcock, commenced in July 2021 in advance of these being converted to Challenger 3s. Equipment replaced during HAAIP will be checked for serviceability, repaired if required, and returned for re-use in the existing Challenger 2 fleet. The hulls will also undergo ultrasonic testing, weld repairs and repainting.

The overall scope of HAAIP includes:

- Upgraded CV12-9A engines for Challenger 3 and CRARRV
- Third Generation Hydrogas Suspension
- New Hydraulic Track Tensioners (HTT) with inline accumulators
- Improved Electric Cold Start System (Intake Manifold Heater)
- Unspecified new components fitted to improve the transmissions
- New Main Engine Air Intake Filters
- Improved Main Engine/Transmission Cooling; fitting new high efficiency radiators (596 sets) and fans (294 triple fan sets with mountings and drive systems). These new more modern assemblies will increase cooling capacity and reduce engine fuel cutback mode (where engine power is reduced if cooling capacity for the main engine and transmission is exceeded) through improved air flow efficiency. The contract for the new cooling fans has been awarded to AMETEK Airtechnology Group (the suppliers of the current design) and the contract for the new radiators awarded to Caterpillar.

As of January 2022 six Challenger 2s were reported to have received the automotive upgrades prior to conversion to Challenger 3s.

=== TES ===
The Theatre Entry Standard (TES), sometimes nicknamed "Megatron", a name originally given to a technology demonstrator of the upgrade at the DVD Defence event in 2013 is an upgrade to the Challenger 2 designed to bring it up to the standards of modern warfare, notably similar to that of the M1 Abrams TUSK packages. The upgrade includes Chobham composite armour installed on the front of the tank and Dorchester reactive, spaced and slat armour plates installed on the sides of the hull and turret. The TES also features a "Bird Table" with four antennas meant to counter radio and telephone signal controlled IEDs. Similar to other upgrades and variants, the TES sports the rifled L30A1 barrel, along with advanced sights that accommodate night vision, NBC protection, Fire Control Systems, climate control and an Auxiliary Power Unit that can power the electronic components of the vehicle if the engine is not running. Additionally, the TES is often equipped with Saab's Mobile Camouflage System.

=== CSP / LEP / Challenger 3 ===
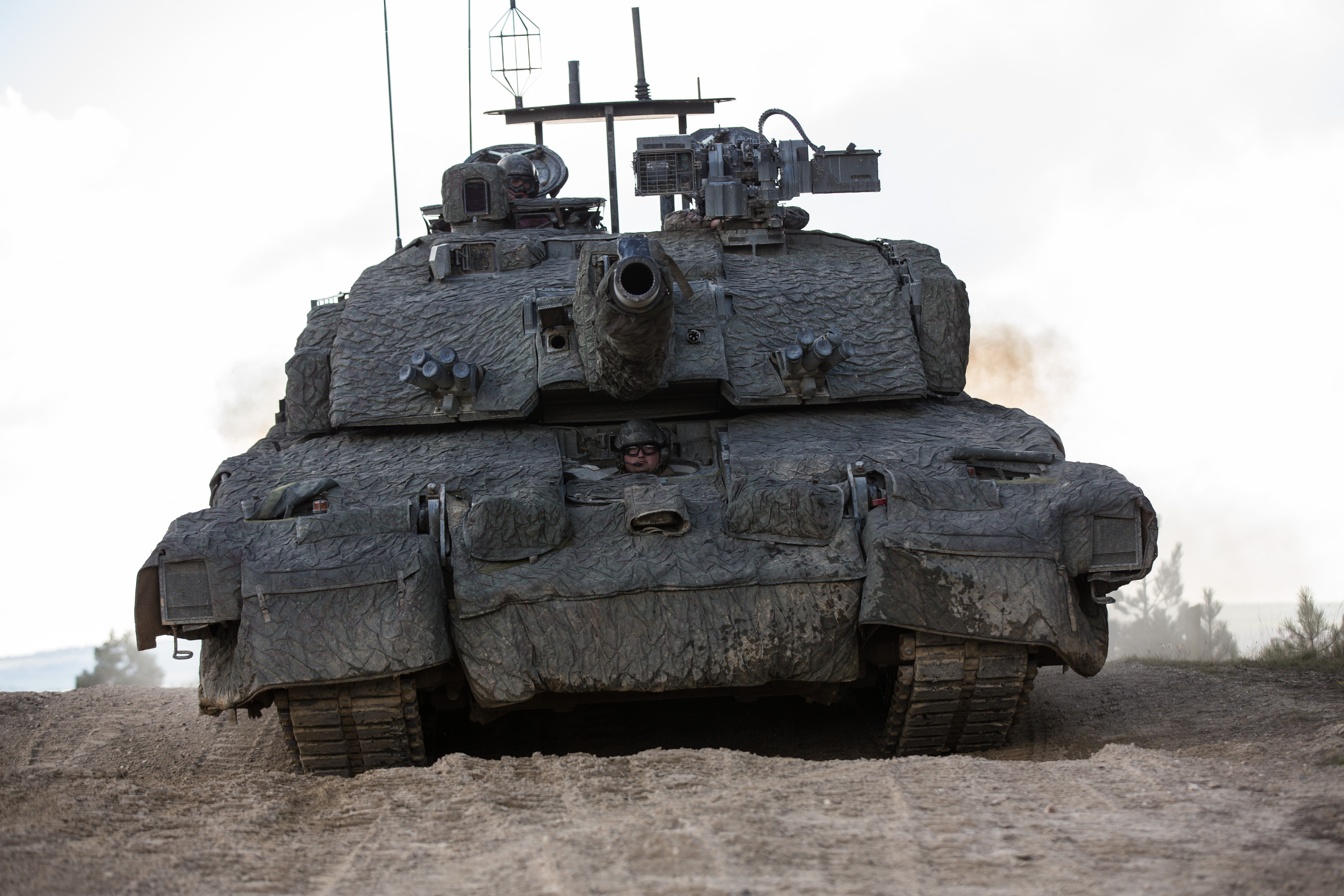
Challenger 2 TES "Megatron", the British Theatre Entry Standard reference vehicle, at Bovington fitted with a Mobile Camouflage System (MCS) in 2016

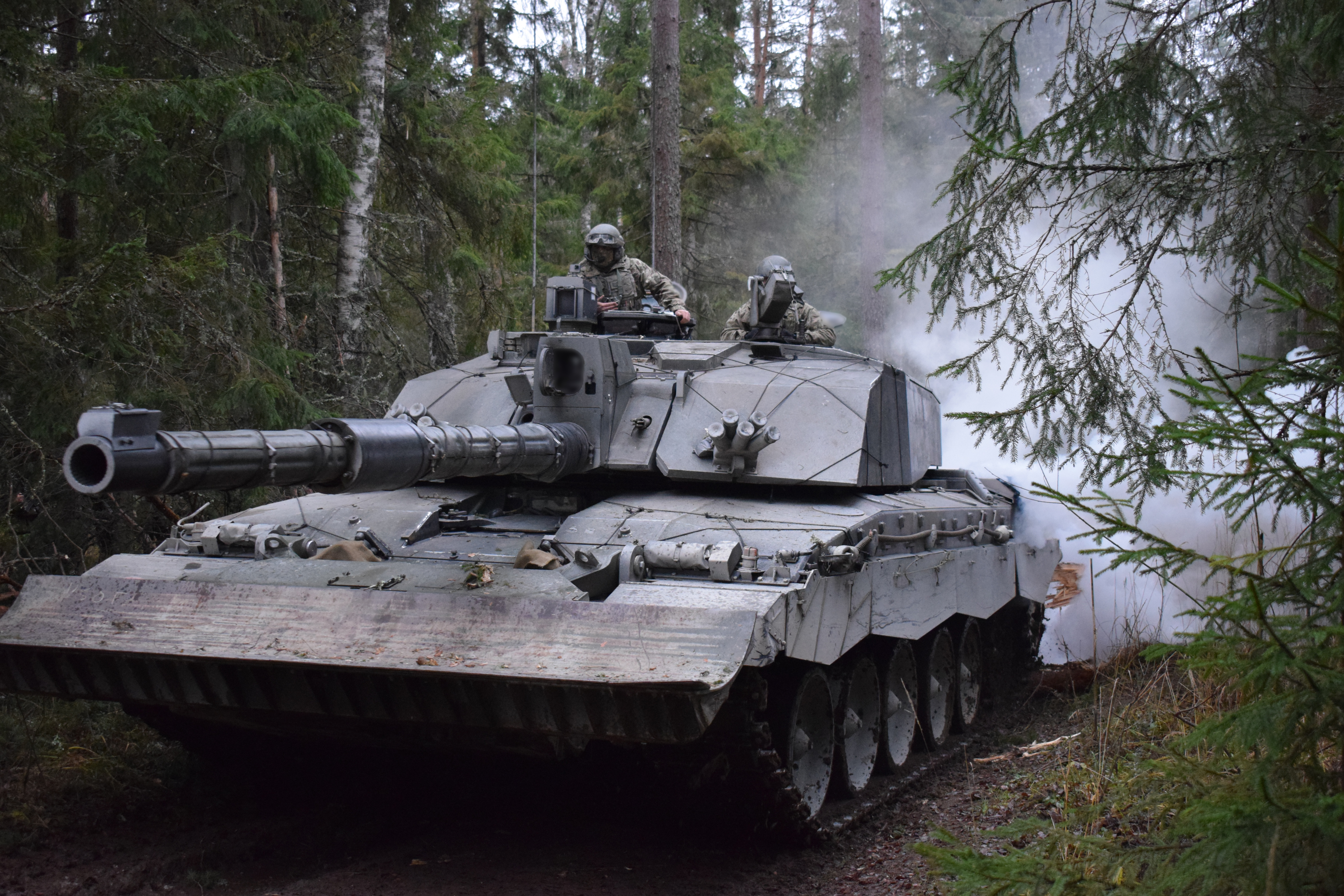
QRH Challenger 2 fitted with dozer blade in Estonia, 2020

In 2005, the MoD recognised a need for a Capability Sustainment Programme (CSP) to extend the service life of the Challenger 2 into the mid-2030s and upgrade its mobility, lethality and survivability. The CSP was planned to be complete by 2020 and was to combine all the upgrades from CLIP, including the fitting of a 120 mm smoothbore gun.

By 2014, the CSP programme had been replaced by the Life Extension Programme (LEP) which shared a similar scope of replacing obsolete components and extending the tank's service life from 2025 to 2035, however the 120 mm smoothbore gun had seemingly been abandoned.

In 2015, the British Army provided an insight into the scope of the LEP, dividing it into four key areas, namely:

- Surveillance and target acquisition: Upgrades to the commander's primary sight and gunner's primary sight, as well as the replacement of the thermal observation and gunnery sights (TOGS) with third-generation thermal imaging.
- Weapon control system: Upgrades to the fire control computer, fire control panel and gun processing unit.
- Mobility: Upgrades including third-generation hydrogas suspension, improved air filtration, CV-12 common rail fuel injection, transmission and cooling.
- Electronic architecture: Upgrades to the gunner's control handles, video distribution architecture, generic vehicle architecture compliant interfaces, increased onboard processing and improved human machine interface.

The MoD also began assessing active protection systems (APS) on the Challenger 2, including MUSS and Rheinmetall's ROSY Rapid Obscurant System.

In August 2016, the MoD awarded assessment phase contracts to several companies for the Life Extension Programme. These included Team Challenger 2 (a consortium led by BAE Systems and including General Dynamics UK), CMI Defence and Ricardo plc, Rheinmetall and Lockheed Martin UK. In November, the MoD shortlisted two teams led by BAE Systems and Rheinmetall to compete for the LEP which was then estimated to be worth £650 million ($802 million).

In October 2018, BAE Systems unveiled its proposed Challenger 2 LEP technology demonstrator, the "Black Night". The new improvements included a Safran PASEO commander's sight, Leonardo thermal imager for the gunner and Leonardo DNVS 4 night sight. The turret also received modifications to improve the speed of traverse and to provide greater space as well as regenerative braking to generate and store power. Other enhancements included a laser warning system and an active protection system. Months later, in January 2019, Rheinmetall unveiled its proposal which included the development of a completely new turret with fully digital electronic architecture, day and night sights for the commander and gunner, and a Rheinmetall L55 120 mm smoothbore gun. Whilst a more substantial upgrade than Black Night, the turret was developed on Rheinmetall's initiative and was not funded by the UK MoD, nor was it part of the MoD's LEP requirements.

In June 2019, BAE Systems and Rheinmetall formed a joint venture company, based in the UK, named Rheinmetall BAE Systems Land (RBSL). Despite the merger, the company was still expected to present two separate proposals for the LEP contract, however, at DSEI 2019, RBSL instead opted to only showcase the Rheinmetall proposal.

In October 2020, the MoD argued against buying a new main battle tank from overseas instead of pursuing the Challenger 2 LEP, stating that an upgraded Challenger 2 would be "comparable – and in certain areas superior" to a Leopard 2 or Abrams.

On 22 March 2021, the MoD published its long-awaited command paper, Defence in a Competitive Age, which confirmed the British Army's plans to upgrade 148 Challenger 2 tanks and designate them Challenger 3. The MoD confirmed the contract with RBSL had been signed, valued at £800 million (US$1 billion), on 7 May 2021. Rheinmetall's more extensive upgrade proposal, including the new 120 mm smoothbore gun, had been accepted. The initial operating capability for the upgraded tanks is expected by 2027, with full operation capability expected to be declared by 2030.

=== Other in-service upgrades ===
On 15 December 2017, BAE Systems was awarded a contract to maintain the Challenger 2's thermal imaging system as part of a £15.4 million interim solution separate to the LEP. In October 2019, it was announced that Thales would be supplying their Catherine Megapixel (MP) thermal imaging camera.

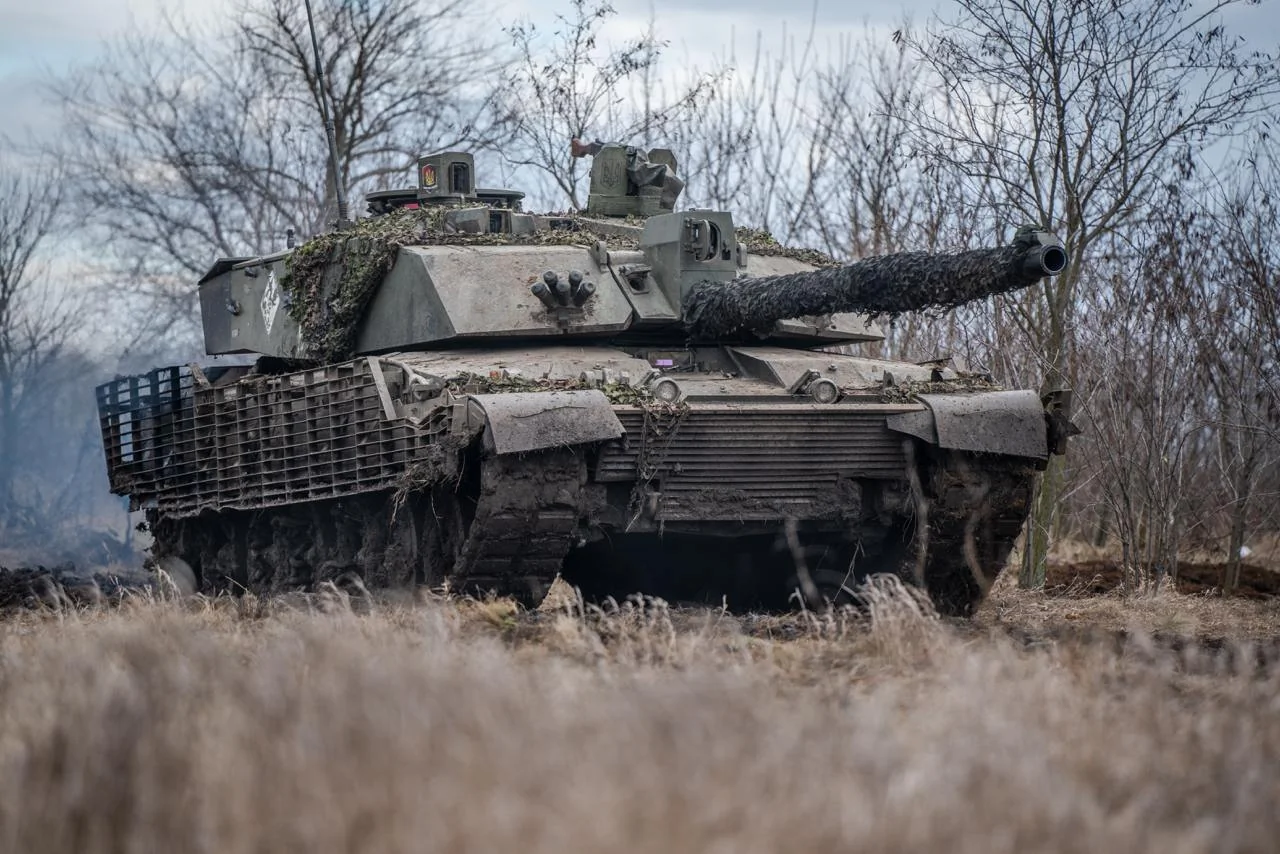
Challenger 2 tank in service with the Ukrainian 82nd Air Assault Brigade, with slat armor added on the hull sides and lower front plate.

In August 2023, photos appeared of Challenger 2s in Ukrainian service featuring top-mounted slat armor, similar to those found on Russian vehicles used in the conflict, primarily to protect from UAV attacks. The tank was also equipped with slat armor covering the hull flanks and lower frontal hull plate.

On 21 January 2025, during DefenceIQ's International Armoured Vehicles exhibition and conference, the British Defense Ministry announced that it was trialing Challenger 2 tanks equipped with anti-drone cages.

== Variants ==
=== Challenger 2 Driver Training Tank ===
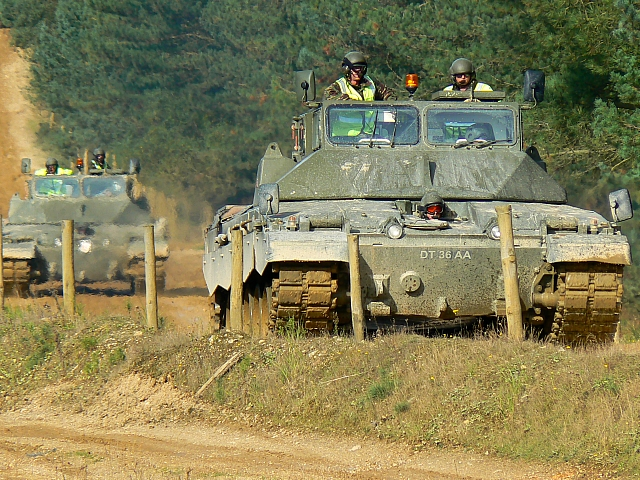
Challenger 2 DTTs on exercise at Bovington Camp in 2007

The Challenger 2 Driver Training Tank (DTT) is based on the Challenger 2 hull. The turret has been replaced with a fixed weighted superstructure to accommodate an instructor and up to 4 trainees. The design is similar to the Challenger 1 derived Challenger Training Tank (CTT). Weighting the superstructure replicates the weight (and therefore also the driving characteristics) of the standard tank in operational service. 22 DTTs are in British service, with 2 in service with Oman.

=== Titan ===
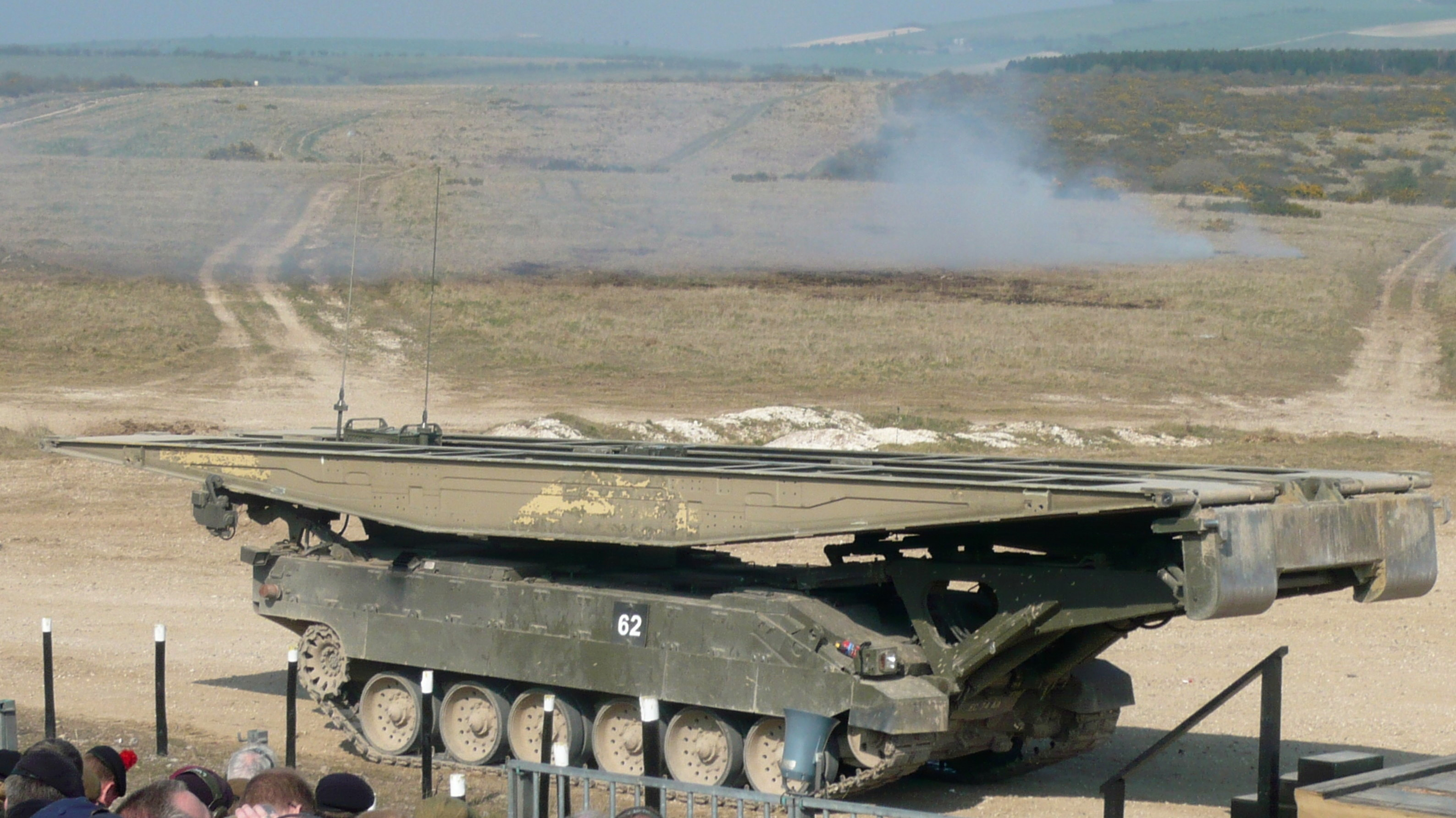
Titan Bridge Launcher with No. 12 Bridge on exercise in the Salisbury Plain Training Area

The Titan armoured bridge layer is based on aspects of the Challenger 2 running gear and replaced the Chieftain Armoured Vehicle Launched Bridge (ChAVLB). The Titan came into service in 2006 with the Royal Engineers, with 33 in service. Titan can carry a single 26-metre-long bridge or two 12-metre-long bridges. It can also be fitted with a bulldozer blade.

=== Trojan ===
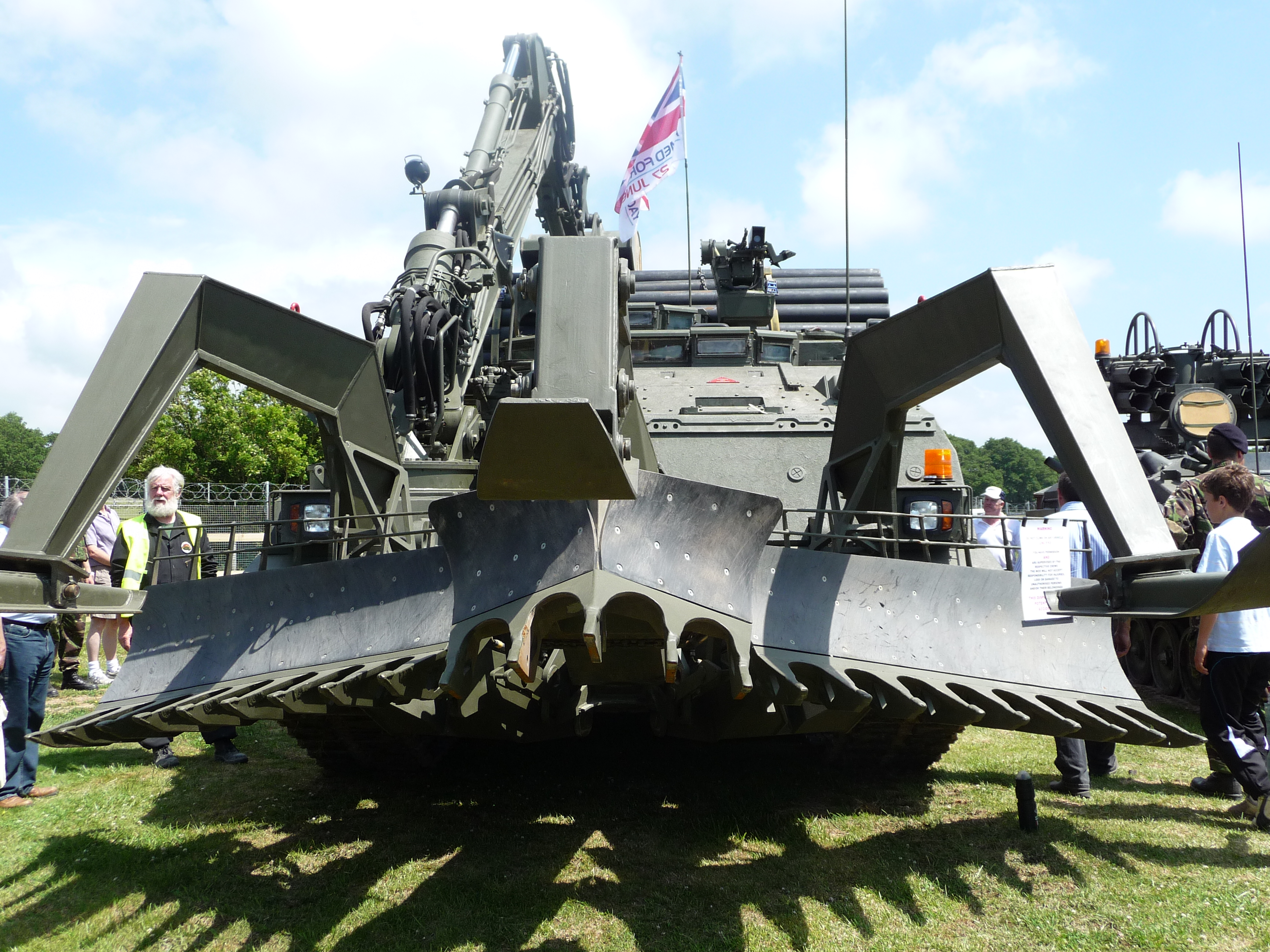
Trojan AVRE

The Trojan Armoured Vehicle Royal Engineers is a combat engineering vehicle designed as a replacement for the Chieftain AVRE (ChAVRE). It uses the Challenger 2 chassis, and carries an articulated excavator arm, a dozer blade, and attachment rails for fascines. Entering service in 2007, 33 were produced.

=== Challenger 2E ===
The Challenger 2E is an export version of the tank. It has a new integrated weapon control and battlefield management system, which includes a gyrostabilised panoramic SAGEM MVS 580-day/thermal sight for the commander and SAGEM SAVAN 15 gyrostabilised day/thermal sight for the gunner, both with eye-safe laser rangefinder. This allows hunter/killer operations with a common engagement sequence. An optional servo-controlled overhead weapons platform can be slaved to the commander's sight to allow operation independent from the turret.

The power pack has been replaced by a new 1,500 hp (1,100 kW) EuroPowerPack with a transversely mounted MTU MT883 diesel engine coupled to Renk HSWL 295TM automatic transmission. The increase in both vehicle performance and durability is significant. The smaller volume but more powerful EuroPowerPack additionally incorporates as standard a cooling system and air intake filtration system proved in desert use.

The free space in the hull is available for ammunition stowage or for fuel, increasing the vehicle's range to 550 km (340 mi). This power pack was previously installed on the French Leclerc tanks delivered to the UAE as well as the recovery tank version of the Leclerc in service with the French Army. Further developed versions of the EuroPowerPack have more recently been installed in the latest serial produced Korean K2 Black Panther tank.

BAES announced in 2005 that development and export marketing of 2E would stop. This has been linked by the media to the failure of the 2E to be selected for the Hellenic Army in 2002, a competition won by the Leopard 2.

=== CRARRV ===
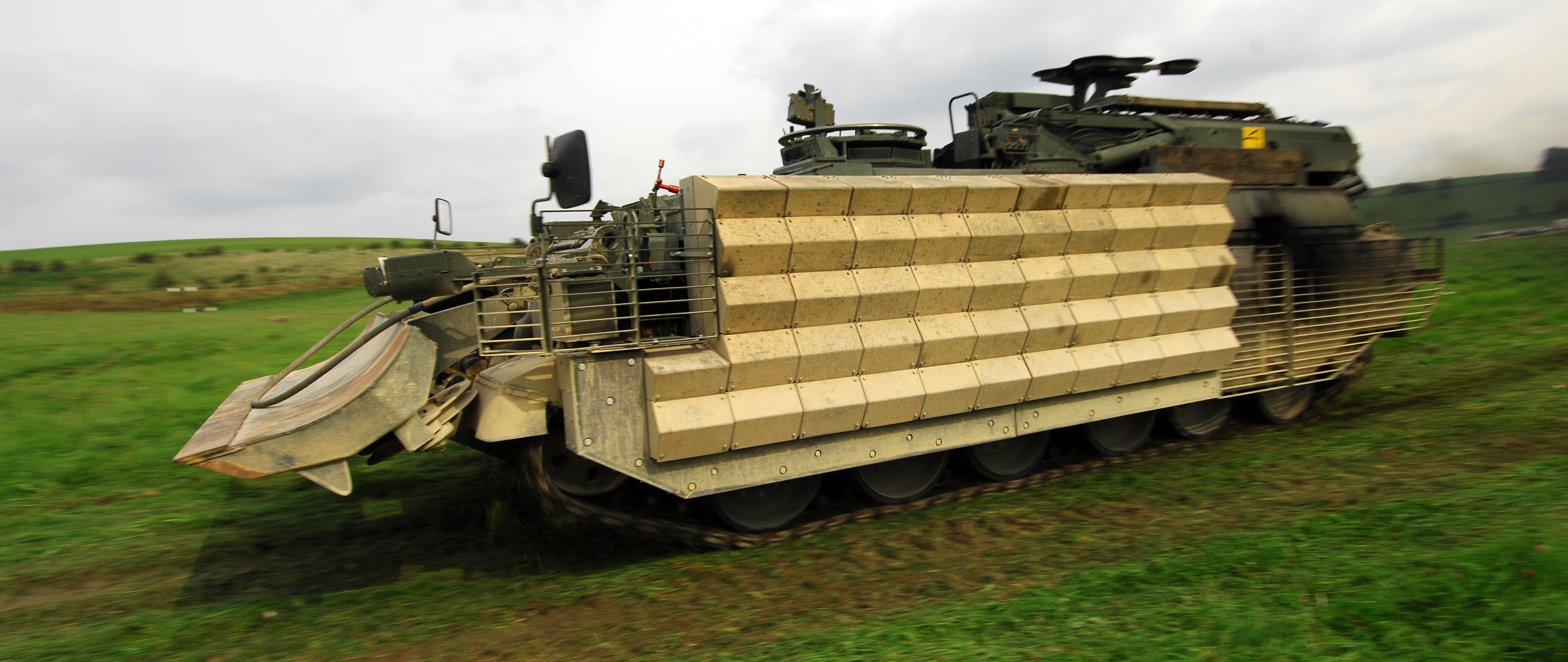
A CRARRV on exercise in the Salisbury Plain Training Area in 2008

The Challenger Armoured Repair and Recovery Vehicle (CRARRV) is an armoured recovery vehicle based on the Challenger 1 hull, designed to repair and recover damaged tanks on the battlefield. Ordered in 1985, and delivered between 1988 and 1993, the CRARRV has subsequently been updated to use a Challenger 2 powertrain consisting of a CV12-5C/6C engine with TN54E transmission. The British Army ordered 80 vehicles. Four CRARRVs were purchased by Oman to complement their acquisition of Challenger 2 tanks.

CRARRVs were first deployed in action in the lead up to the First Gulf War, Operation Granby in 1991. They were subsequently deployed during the 2003 invasion of Iraq, Operation Telic in 2003, alongside standard Challenger 2 MBTs.

=== Challenger 2 Streetfighter ===
The Challenger 2 Streetfighter is a package for the Challenger 2 that aims to equip the tank for urban combat. The package features additional machine guns, usage of Elbit System's Iron Vision system and various situational awareness systems. Additionally, the Streetfighter may carry a dozer blade and or a surface-to-surface missile launcher installed on top of the back of the turret which may hold up to two Brimstone 3 missiles.

== Operators ==
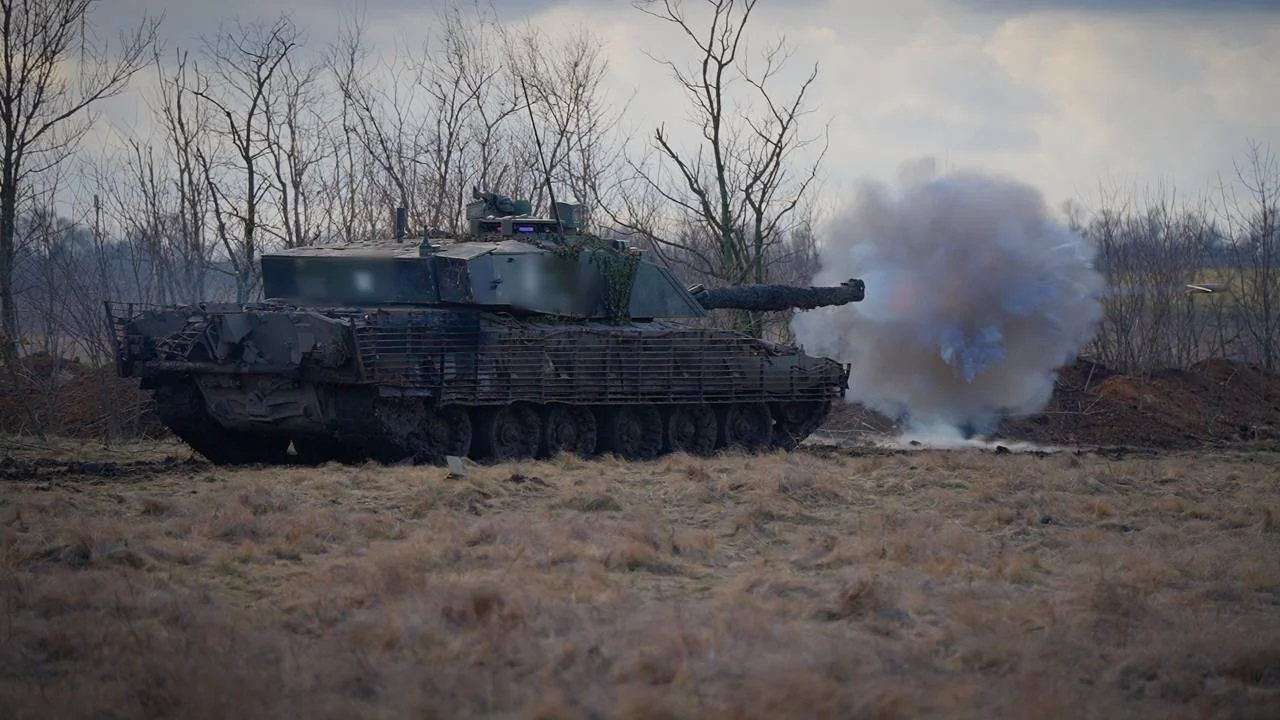
Ukrainian Challenger 2 in November 2024

- United Kingdom: British Army – 213 Challenger 2 in service as of 2025. 386 delivered + 22 driver trainer units. 219 remained in operational service in 2024.
- Oman: Royal Army of Oman – 38 Challenger 2 in service as of 2025. 38 Challenger 2 purchased from 1993 onwards.
- Ukraine: Ukrainian Air Assault Forces – in January 2023 it was confirmed that the United Kingdom will supply Ukraine with 14 Challenger 2 main battle tanks along with support vehicles. On 29 January 2023, the first Ukrainian troops arrived in the UK to begin training on Challenger 2 tanks. These troops completed their training on 27 March and returned to Ukraine; the first Challenger 2 tanks were delivered to Ukraine on the same date. As of 10 March 2024, 13 units remained in operational status among Ukrainian Armed Forces. As of 1 April 2025, two units have been confirmed destroyed with a further two potentially damaged and destroyed, based on visual evidence.

== Accidents and incidents ==
- In July 2001, the commander and operator-loader of a Challenger 2 were killed in an accident in the Salisbury Plain Training Area, near Imber. Their tank rolled over after falling off the edge of a track, crushing both men who suffered fatal injuries. At the subsequent inquest, the jury returned a verdict of accidental death, and called for improvements in training given to inexperienced tank crews.
- On 1 June 2015, a Challenger 2 on exercise in Lippe, near Paderborn, Germany, crushed the car of a learner driver who pulled out in front of a column of British armoured vehicles. The driver was unhurt.
- On 14 June 2017, a Challenger 2 from The Royal Tank Regiment suffered an ammunition explosion during live firing exercises at the Castlemartin Range in Pembrokeshire. The tank was firing 120 mm practice shells with a standard propellant charge. The explosion critically injured the four-man crew, with two later dying of their wounds in hospital. The incident resulted in all British Army tank firing exercises being suspended for 48 hours while the cause of the explosion was investigated. It was later determined that a bolt vent axial (BVA) seal assembly had been removed during an earlier exercise and had not been replaced at the time of the incident, allowing explosive gases to enter the turret space; the lack of a written process for removal and replacement of the seal assembly meant that the crew at the time of the incident were unaware of its absence, and it was also noted that inadequate consideration had been given during the production of the L30 gun as to whether it could be fired without the seal assembly. A second explosion that occurred during the incident was attributed to the detonation of bag charges that had not been stowed in the internal ammunition bins, as required by correct procedure.

=== War Thunder classified documents incident ===
In July 2021, excerpts of the tank's Army Equipment Support Publication (i.e. the user manual), containing technical specifications of the vehicle, were posted on the official forums of the war simulation game War Thunder; the poster, allegedly a Challenger 2 tank commander, said he had done so in the hope that developer Gaijin Entertainment would modify the performance of the in-game tank to match the specifications detailed in the document. The leaked excerpts of the AESP document had been edited to appear as though it had been declassified under the UK's Freedom of Information Act 2000. However, the MoD confirmed that the information was in fact still classified, and that if Gaijin were to disseminate the tank's specifications, they would be liable to prosecution under the Official Secrets Act. Due to these possible legal penalties, Gaijin refused to handle or utilise the leaked specifications.

== Future replacement ==
Following Britain's exit from the European Union, early in 2021 the United Kingdom entered talks to be allowed into the European Main Battle Tank project as an observer. This may have a bearing on a future replacement of the Challenger 3.

== Vehicles on display ==
Many of the pre-production prototype Challenger 2 vehicles are on display in the United Kingdom:

- The third and fifth prototype vehicles are displayed at The Tank Museum, Bovington, Dorset.
- The fourth prototype is a gate guardian outside the Royal Armoured Corps Gunnery School, Lulworth Camp, Dorset.
- The seventh prototype vehicle has been plinthed outside the National Army Museum in Chelsea, London, since 2021. This vehicle also appeared in Vickers' original sales marketing.
- The eighth prototype is in the teaching collection of the Defence Academy, Shrivenham, Oxfordshire.
- The ninth prototype vehicle has been displayed outside the Discovery Museum in Newcastle upon Tyne since 2014. It was previously displayed outside the Vickers Elswick plant in the city.
- A Challenger 2, likely a prototype, is plinthed outside Allenby Barracks, Bovington Camp, Dorset.
- The prototype CRARRV is on display at The REME Museum at MoD Lyneham, Wiltshire.

In 2021, the then UK Minister for Defence Procurement, Jeremy Quin, acknowledged in a written answer, that were no current plans to dispose of a production vehicle to a museum, but that the UK MoD were aware that The Tank Museum intend to secure one for their collection.

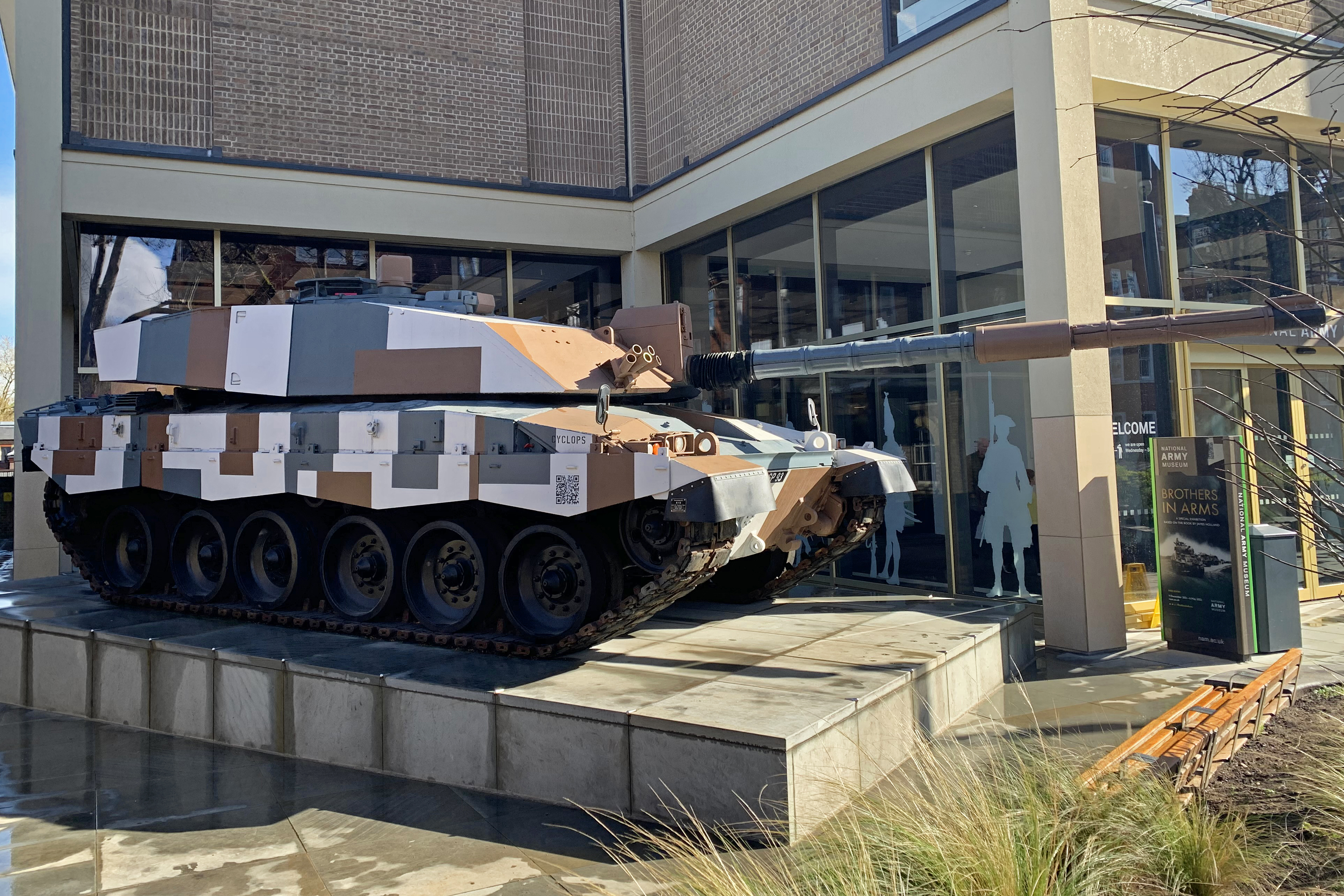
Challenger 2 on display outside the National Army Museum, London

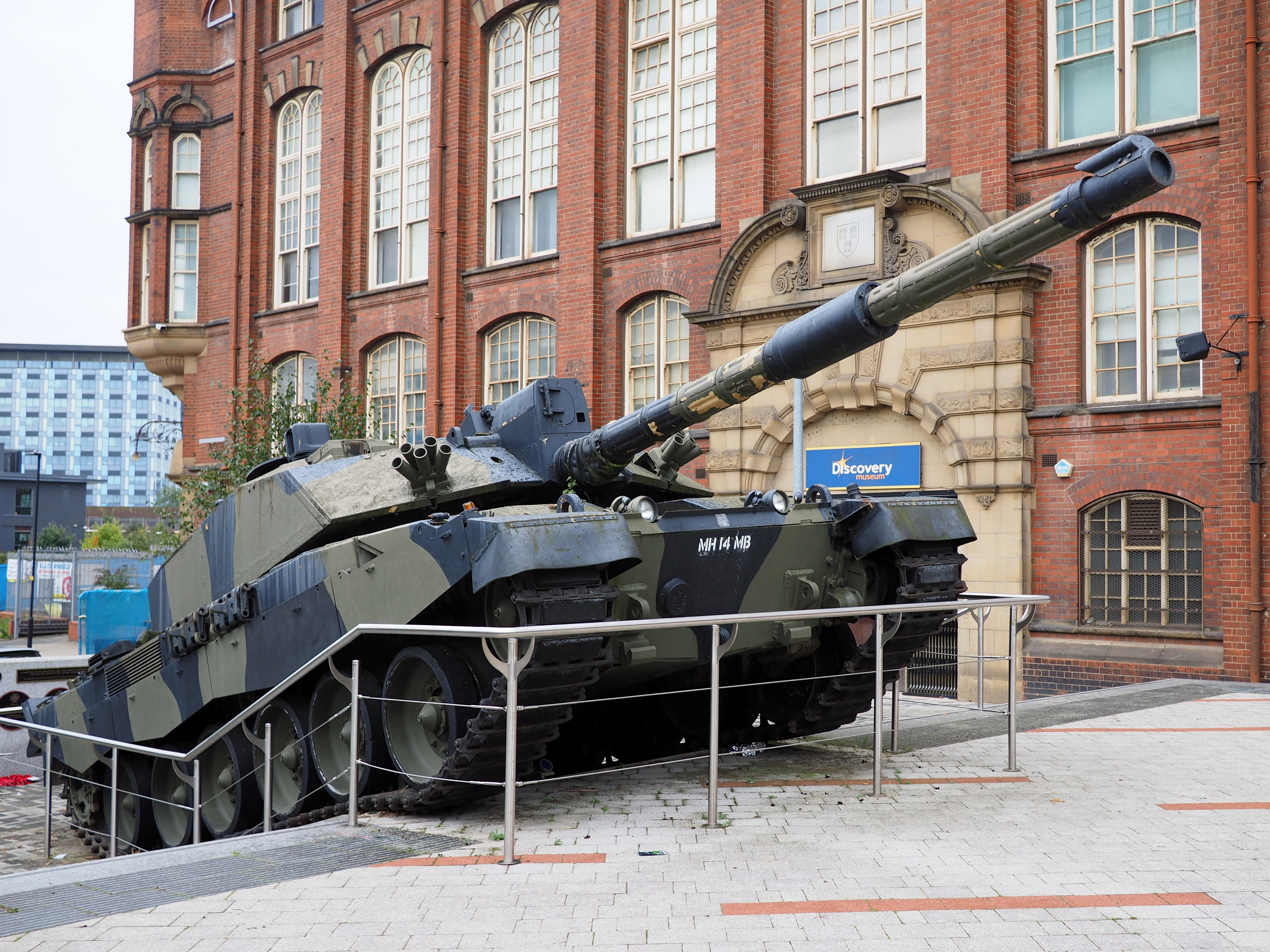
Challenger 2 on display outside the Discovery Museum in September 2022

== See also ==
- List of main battle tanks by generation
