= 82nd Air Assault Brigade =

Ukrainian Air Assault Forces unit

- 82 окрема десантно-штурмова бригада
- Sleeve patch of the brigade featuring a falcon
- Founded: December 2022
- Country: Ukraine
- Branch: Ukrainian Air Assault Forces
- Role: Air assault
- Size: 2,000
- Garrison/HQ: Chernivtsi, Chernivtsi Oblast
- Nickname: Bukovynska
- Equipment: Challenger 2, Marder 1A3, Stryker, M119
- Engagements: Russian invasion of Ukraine; 2023 Ukrainian counteroffensive; Northern Kharkiv front; Kursk campaign
- Decorations: For Courage and Bravery

Commanders
- Current commander: Lieutenant Colonel Volodymyr Hutsul
- Notable commanders: Colonel Dmytro Voloshyn

Insignia
- Flag

The 82nd Separate Air Assault Brigade Bukovynska (Ukrainian: 82 окрема десантно-штурмова бригада; 82 ОДШБр; MUN A2582) is a unit of the Ukrainian Air Assault Forces. The brigade is located in Chernivtsi.

== History ==
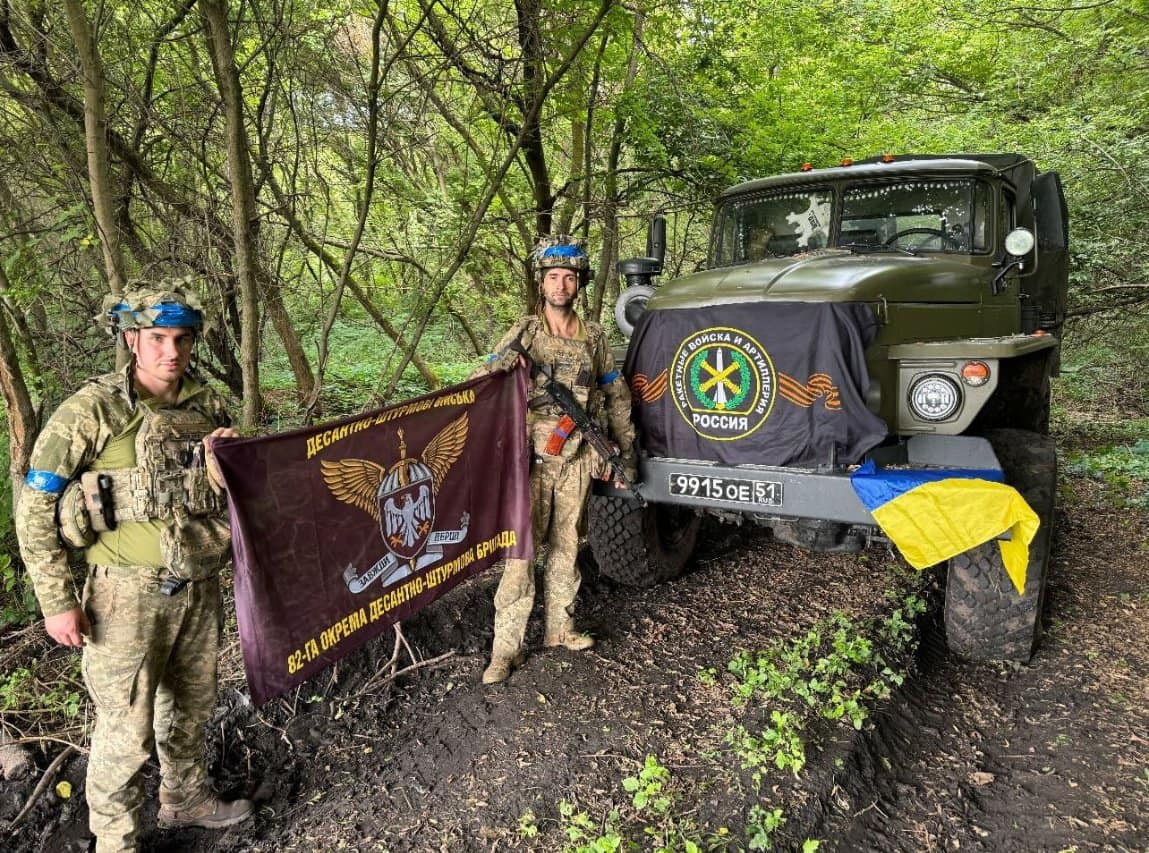
Ural-4320 truck captured by the 82nd Air Assault Brigade in Russia's Kursk region, August 2024

The 3rd Battalion Tactical Group of Ukraine's 80th Air Assault Brigade was reorganized into the 82nd Air Assault Brigade in December 2022.

The brigade's creation was announced as part of an expansion of the Armed Forces of Ukraine, alongside eight other brigades. Initial reports suggested that, alongside the aforementioned units, the 82nd would be outfitted with older equipment from existing units which are being retrofitted with new Western supplies.

In February and March 2023, the 82nd Brigade underwent training in NATO countries including Germany and the United Kingdom. Throughout the summer of 2023, the brigade reportedly received a significant amount of Western military equipment.

In May 2023 Forbes reported that the 2022–2023 Pentagon document leaks indicated the 82nd would be outfitted with new equipment that Ukraine received. Including 14 Challenger 2s, 90 Strykers, 40 Marders and 24 M119 howitzers. The brigade's core consists of veterans from the 25th Airborne Brigade and the 80th Air Assault Brigade which were trained on the new equipment in the United Kingdom. Forbes speculated that the 82nd Air Assault Brigade will form part of the spearhead for the anticipated 2023 Ukrainian counteroffensive.

The Kyiv Post reinforced Forbes reporting that the unit would consist of "about half of [the Ukrainian military's] best NATO-delivered infantry armored vehicles", but assessed that when the unit would see combat, despite its Western equipment and training, it would still be a "green formation fighting together as a unit for the first time."

On 21 June 2023, the first Challenger 2s were seen in the 2023 Ukrainian counteroffensive. The only Ukrainian brigade reported to have Challenger 2s was the 82nd Airborne, but there had been no mention of the unit's involvement in the counteroffensive at the time. On June 14, the Asia Times reported that the brigade's artillery units were drawn from strategic reserves to assist on the Velyka Novosilka front.

On June 22, Forbes assessed that the 82nd, and the 117th Mechanized Brigade were being held in reserve waiting for a significant breach in Russian lines to allow them to storm Melitopol. On August 16, the Kyiv Post claimed that the unit was "finally in action" and that there was evidence that "the 82nd Air Assault Brigade is heavily involved in the fight for the village of Robotyne in the western Zaporizhzhia region". It was later reported that the brigade had taken part in combat near Robotyne and the neighboring village of Verbove.

Starting on 12 May 2024, units of the 82nd Brigade took part in the defense of Vovchansk.

Brigade commander Dmytro Voloshyn said that in June 2024, the 82nd Air Assault Brigade began preparations for the Ukrainian operation in Russia's Kursk region.

Units of the 82nd Brigade took part in the Ukrainian operation in Russia's Kursk region from 6 August 2024, the first day of the incursion. One week into the operation, the brigade had advanced 28 kilometers into Russian territory, according to its commander at the time, Dmytro Voloshyn. As of January 2025, units of the brigade were involved in combat near the village of Nikolskii, where they took part in joint combat operations with the 47th Mechanized Brigade. During the same month, units of the brigade were reportedly involved in combat on the Russkoye Porechnoye front. The 82nd Brigade was rotated to the Donbass front in May 2025.

On 14 March 2026 the unit was awarded the Presidential Award For Courage and Bravery by the President of Ukraine Volodymyr Zelenskyy.

== Equipment ==
The brigade is armed with tanks Challenger 2 (14 units), Marder 1A3 IFV (40 units), Stryker APC (90 units) and M119 howitzers (24 units).

== Structure ==
As of 2024, the brigade's structure is as follows:

- 82nd Air Assault Brigade
  - Brigade Headquarters and HQ Company
  - 3rd Battalion Tactical Group. Formed in 2013 on the basis of 300th Mechanized Regiment.
  - 1st Battalion
  - 2nd Battalion
  - 3rd Battalion
  - Tank Company
  - 82nd Field Artillery Group
    - Headquarters and Target Acquisition Battery "Silver Falcon"
    - 1st Self-propelled Artillery Battalion
    - 2nd Self-propelled Artillery Battalion
    - Rocket Artillery Battalion
    - Anti-Tank Artillery Battalion
  - Anti-Aircraft Defense Battalion
  - Reconnaissance Company
  - FPV Drone Company "Wild Division"
  - Attack Drone Company "Specialists"
  - Combat Engineer Battalion
  - Maintenance Company
  - Logistics Company
  - Signals Company
  - Radar Company
  - Medical Company
  - Chemical, Biological, Radiological and Nuclear Defense Company
  - MP Company
  - Brigade Band
