= Challenger tank =

There have been four tanks named Challenger in British military service.

- Cruiser Mk VIII Challenger in service during World War II
- Challenger 1 in service from the mid-1980s to early 21st century
- Challenger 2 in service from 1998 onwards
- Challenger 3 in development; predicted to enter service from 2027 onwards
