= KE2020Neo =

German-designed tank ammunition

KE2020Neo, also known as eKE (enhanced Kinetic Energy), is a 120×570mm NATO armor-piercing fin-stabilized discarding sabot (APFSDS) tank ammunition developed by the German defense company Rheinmetall. Designed to be fired from 120 mm smoothbore tank guns, the round utilizes a high-strength tungsten penetrator to defeat modern composite armor and active protection systems. It is intended for use by the German Bundeswehr and the British Army in platforms such as the Leopard 2 and the Challenger 3. The munition was developed to maximize the performance of Rheinmetall's modernized L55A1 gun and is estimated to offer a 20% increase in armor penetration over previous generations of APFSDS rounds.

== Development ==
Development of the KE2020Neo was initiated to maximize the remaining growth potential of the 120 mm smoothbore weapon system, specifically leveraging the higher pressure limits of Rheinmetall's modernized L55A1 gun. A formal qualification contract was signed between Rheinmetall Waffe Munition GmbH and the Federal Office of Bundeswehr Equipment, Information Technology and In-Service Support (BAAINBw) in September 2020.

In October 2024, Rheinmetall announced that the ammunition had successfully reached qualification readiness. Subsequently, the company was commissioned by the German and British armed forces to manufacture qualification samples.

== Design and specifications ==
The KE2020Neo is a single-piece munition belonging to Rheinmetall's long-running series of kinetic energy projectiles, superseding older variants such as the DM53, DM63, and DM73.

Unlike the depleted uranium (DU) penetrators commonly used by the United States and historically by the United Kingdom, the KE2020Neo utilizes a newly designed, elongated high-strength tungsten alloy penetrator. This aligns with German legal restrictions on depleted uranium while attempting to match or exceed its armor-piercing capabilities.

While exact classified specifications remain unpublished, the munition is designed to operate at the extreme service condition pressures offered by the L55A1 gun. Defense publications estimate that the KE2020Neo aims to deliver a 20% increase in armor penetration performance compared to the previous generation of APFSDS rounds.

== Operators ==
- Germany: Selected for the Bundeswehr to equip modernized variants of the Leopard 2 main battle tank.
- United Kingdom: Selected for the British Army as the primary kinetic energy anti-tank round for the upcoming Challenger 3 main battle tank, marking the UK's transition from 120 mm rifled ammunition to NATO-standard 120 mm smoothbore ammunition.
