= Rheinmetall BAE Systems Land =

British/German joint-venture defence and security company

Rheinmetall BAE Systems Land Limited
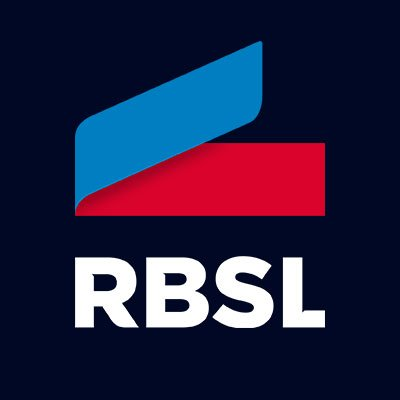
- Industry: Arms industry
- Founded: 2019; 7 years ago
- Headquarters: Telford, Shropshire, England, UK
- Products: Military vehicles
- Number of employees: About 450
- Parent: BAE Systems; Rheinmetall
- Website: rbsl.com

Rheinmetall BAE Systems Land Limited (RBSL) is a joint venture between the United Kingdom’s BAE Systems and Germany's Rheinmetall AG for military vehicle design, manufacture and support. The company received regulatory approval on 13 June 2019. It is based in the United Kingdom, with headquarters in Telford, and other sites at Newcastle upon Tyne, Bristol and Dorset.

== History ==
The RBSL joint venture business consists of BAE Systems Land UK, the UK land systems business segment of BAE Systems, and Germany’s Rheinmetall AG’s defence arm. To create the joint-venture, BAE Systems sold a 55% share of BAE Systems Land UK to Rheinmetall AG.

The RBSL joint venture was formally announced on 21 January 2019, with the cost of Rheinmetall’s 55% share of BAE Systems’ Land UK business being £28.6 million. The acquisition did not include Land UK's munitions and technology interests, or the CTA International (CTAI) JV BAE Systems has with Nexter Systems, the latter a medium-calibre weapon system that is designed for fighting vehicles. On 13 June 2019, the UK Competition and Markets Authority (CMA) approved the proposed joint venture.

In addition to managing and growing the existing combat vehicle support business, the stated intent for the JV was to play a major role in the delivery of the British Army’s new Mechanised Infantry Vehicle (MIV) and other strategic combat vehicle programmes, including the upgrade of the Challenger 2 main battle tank fleet. While initially focused on these major UK programmes, RBSL would also form an integral part of Rheinmetall’s Vehicle Systems Division and participate in military vehicle contracts globally.

== UK contract awards ==
=== Mechanised Infantry Vehicle (MIV) ===
In November 2020, the ARTEC consortium, jointly owned by Rheinmetall and KNDS Deutschland (KMW), announced that it had awarded two separate subcontracts to RBSL and the KNDS UK unit of KNDS respectively for the local production and assembly of over 500 Boxer armoured vehicle for the UK. The contract with RBSL is worth around £860 million. Delivery of the vehicles is expected to start from 2023.

=== Challenger 3 ===
The original intention of the Challenger 2 Life Extension Project was to replace obsolete systems in the turret to extend the British Army's Challenger 2 tank’s service life to 2035. Rheinmetall and BAE Systems had been competing as separate entities for the C2 LEP. In September 2019, a single C2 LEP proposal was unveiled under RBSL. It comprised a refurnished Challenger 2 hull fitted with a new all-welded turret armed with a Rheinmetall Rh-120 L55A1 smoothbore gun supported by a computerised fire-control system.

In October 2020, it was reported that Babcock DSG was involved in the bid for the C2 LEP, as the contract "has been split into different strands to ease the funding through HM Treasury".

On 18 March 2021, Rheinmetall announced that the company had won the C2 LEP contract, and believed to be worth €750 million. It had previously been stated that if selected for the C2 LEP, the vehicle would be manufactured by RBSL in Telford. On 22 March 2021 the C2 LEP was renamed the Challenger 3.

=== Mission Master UGV ===
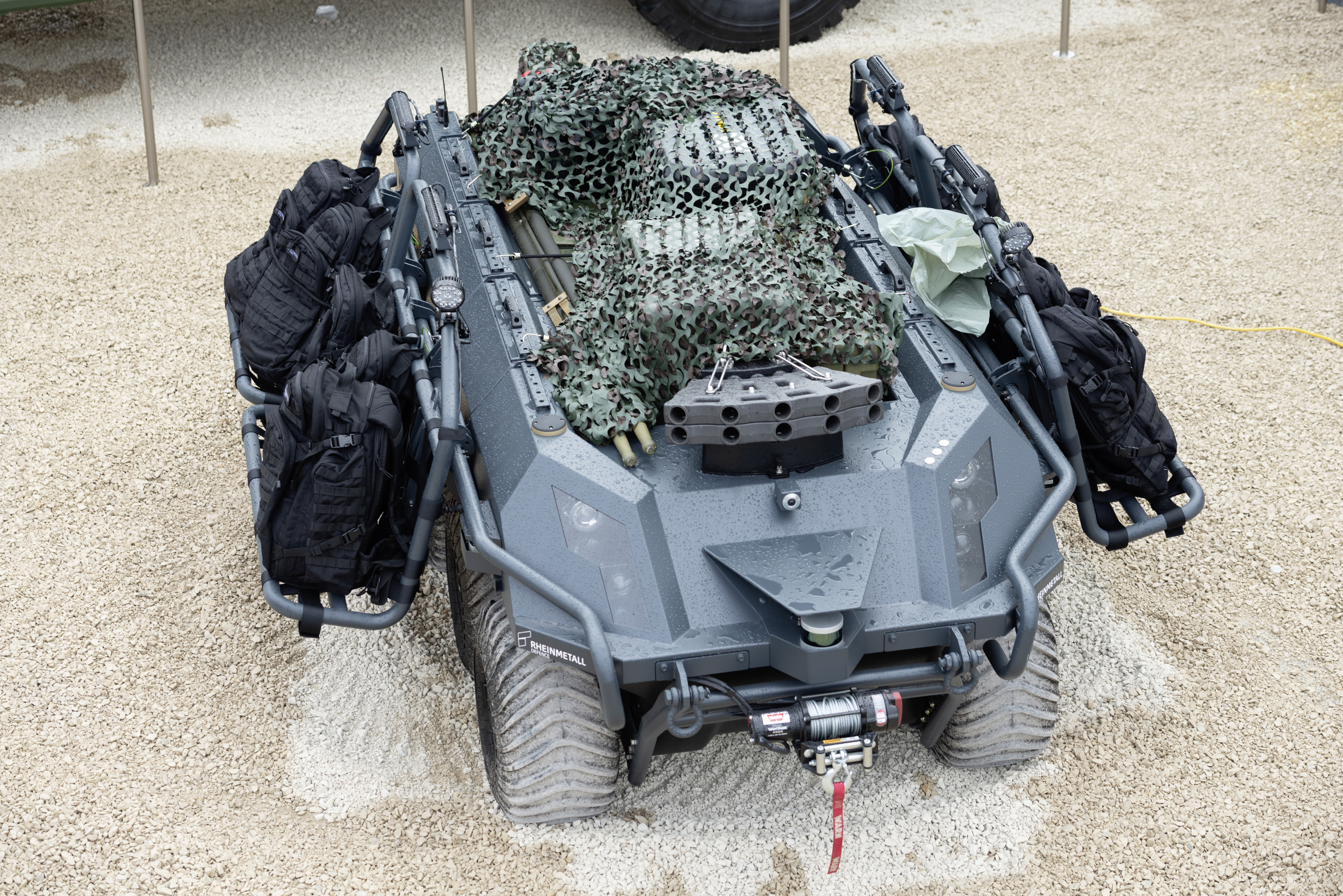
The Mission Master unmanned ground vehicle

In May 2020, RBSL secured a training and maintenance contract with Rheinmetall Canada to support the delivery of Rheinmetall's Mission Master unmanned ground vehicles (UGVs) to the UK Ministry of Defence. Under the terms of the contract RBSL will provide training for operators and maintenance support for the British Army, who will use the vehicles in the UK's Robotic Platoon Vehicle experimentation programme. The aim of this programme is to help determine the extent to which UGVs can enhance the British Army's combat capabilities and effectiveness, especially for dismounted troops at platoon level.

To reduce the load carried by foot soldiers, the Army has received four cargo variants of the Mission Master, these each able to carry up to half a tonne of supplies, tactical kit, or medical equipment and come complete with two stretchers that can be easily attached in just 60 seconds to carry wounded personnel.

=== FUCHS CBRN upgrade ===
In October 2020, RBSL was awarded a £16 million contract by the UK's Defence Equipment and Support (DE&S) organisation to upgrade and sustain the British Army's fleet of Rheinmetall-supplied TPz Fuchs armoured reconnaissance vehicles. Work will be conducted from RBSL's Telford facility. The contract includes a new support agreement to provide spares, maintenance, and training for the vehicles.

== Norwegian contract award ==
The Norwegian Defence Research Establishment awarded Rheinmetall a contract for delivery of a Mission Master XT to the Norwegian Army. In August 2023, the army's intelligence battalion received a unit for testing.
