= Puma (German infantry fighting vehicle) =

German infantry fighting vehicle

Schützenpanzer Puma
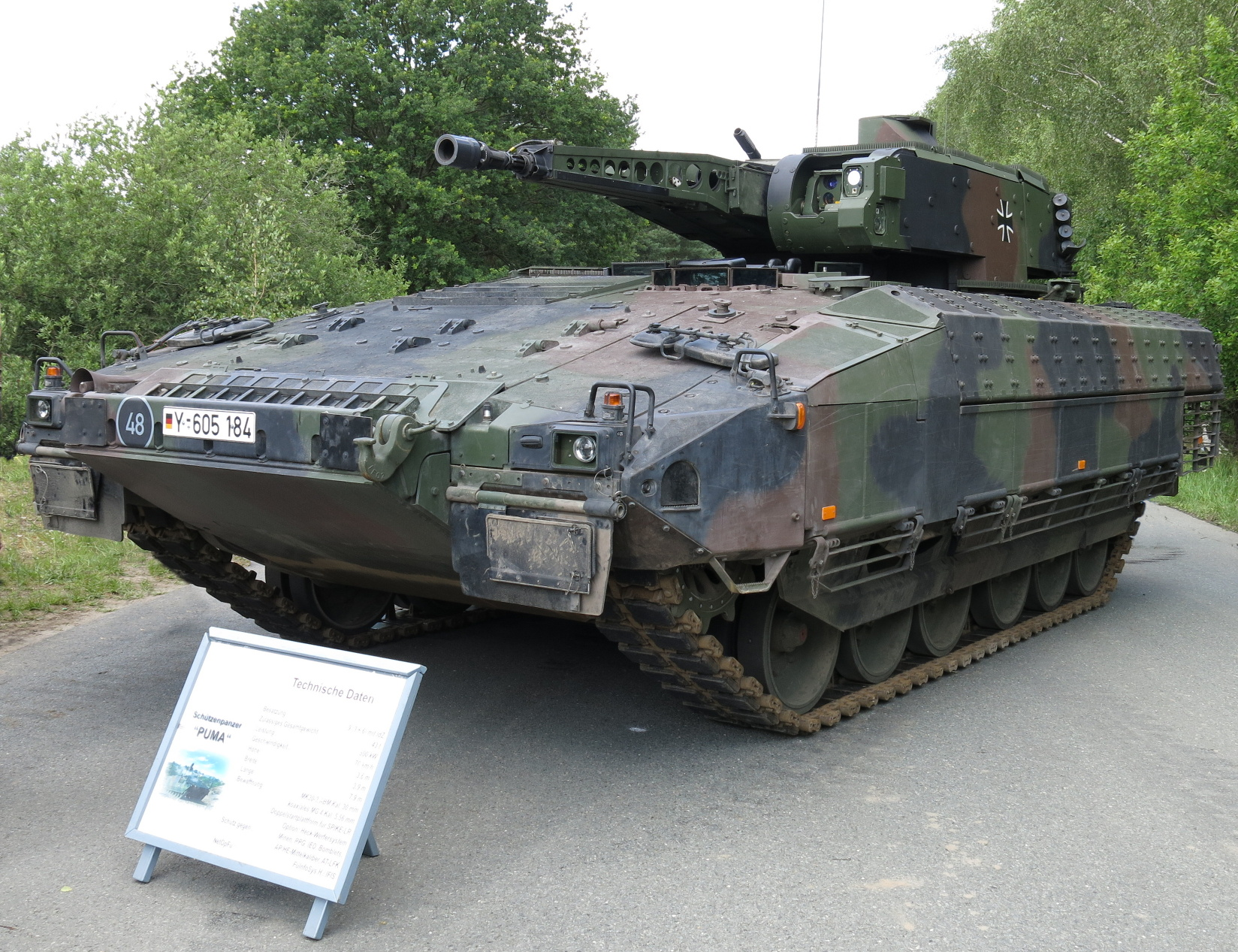
- Type: Infantry fighting vehicle
- Place of origin: Germany

Service history
- In service: 2015–present
- Used by: Bundeswehr

Production history
- Designer: Krauss-Maffei Wegmann; Rheinmetall Landsysteme
- Designed: 1995–2009
- Produced: 2009–present
- No. built: 350 as of December 2022

Specifications
- Mass: 31.4 t (69,225 lb) (level A); 43.0 t (94,799 lb) (level C)
- Length: 7.4 m (24 ft)
- Width: 3.7 m (12 ft) with base armour 4.0 m (13 ft) up-armoured
- Height: 3.1 m (10 ft) for the turret roof 3.6 m (12 ft) for the optics
- Crew: 3
- Passengers: 6
- Armor: Modular composite armor including IBD's AMAP, NERA from GEKE and DND Explosive Reactive Armor
- Main armament: Autocanon MK 30-2/ABM (30 mm, 200 rounds ready to fire, 200 in storage)
- Secondary armament: Base variant: HK MG4 (5.56×45mm NATO); S1 variant: Spike LR (MELLS) ATGM; Multishot grenade launcher for close-in defense
- Engine: MTU Fried. MT 892 Ka-501 v10 11.1-litre 1,088 PS (800 kW) (at 3,800 rpm), 2,200 N⋅m (1,623 ft⋅lb)
- Power/weight: 18.6 kW/t
- Transmission: Renk HSWL 256
- Suspension: Horstman hydrostruts
- Fuel capacity: 900 L (240 U.S. gal; 200 imp gal)
- Operational range: 600 km (373 mi) on road
- Maximum speed: 70 km/h (43 mph) on road

The Schützenpanzer Puma (SPz Puma), meaning “Infantry fighting vehicle Puma”, is a German infantry fighting vehicle (IFV), per the Panzergrenadier-doctrine, designed to replace the aging Marder IFVs currently in service with the German Army. Production of the first batch of 350 vehicles began in 2010 and was completed in August 2021. A second batch of 229 Pumas received funding. Mass production began on 6 July 2009. The companies responsible for this project are KNDS Deutschland and Rheinmetall, which created a joint venture, Projekt System Management GmbH (PSM). The Puma is one of the world's best-protected IFVs, while still having a high power-to-weight ratio.

== History ==
=== Development ===
The Puma (formerly also named Igel (hedgehog) and Panther) started as a follow-up project to the German 1996 "NGP" project (Neue Gepanzerte Plattformen, "New Armored Platforms"). Its aim was to collect ideas for a common base vehicle that could be used for a variety of tasks including that of the APC, IFV, air defense and replacing and assisting the MBT in the frontline combat role. The NGP project was ended in 2001.

The lessons learned were incorporated into the new tactical concept named neuer Schützenpanzer ("new IFV") in 1998. Planning for the Puma as the successor of the Marder began in 2002. That same year, the German Army (Heer) placed an order for the delivery of five pre-production vehicles and their logistics and training services at the end of 2004. On 8 November 2007, a budget of €3 billion to acquire 405 Pumas (excluding the five Pumas that had already been delivered to the German Army for trials) was agreed upon.

On 6 December 2010, the first two serial vehicles were handed over to the German Bundesamt für Wehrtechnik und Beschaffung.

The Puma successfully completed cold tests in Norway in 2012. In August 2013, two Pumas were airlifted to the United Arab Emirates for hot weather tests. Trials included suitability for hot weather operations, firing and driving maneuvers in desert conditions, as well as firepower and mobility evaluations. During the trials, the temperature profiles inside the vehicle were measured, then compared to the ambient temperature.

On 13 April 2015, the Federal Office of Bundeswehr Equipment, Information Technology and In-Service Support (BAAINBw) granted authorization of use of the Puma IFV. This began a program to "train the trainers" on the first seven vehicles and additional ones until the end of the year, when a training center will be set up to put Panzer Grenadiers of mechanized infantry companies through a three-month course to familiarize them with their Pumas. The Puma officially entered service with the German military on 24 June 2015.

=== Deliveries and future upgrades ===
Given the advanced age of the current Marder IFVs, and because the world market does not offer any vehicle comparable with the specifications to which the Puma is built, the acquisition of the new vehicles was unanimously voted for by the Budget Committee of the Bundestag.

350 Pumas were delivered to replace the more than 40-year-old Marders. Full operational readiness was to be achieved by 2024.

The German Army will use €500 million to modernize 40 Pumas by 2023, with more effective weaponry and communications technology capable of rapidly providing a situation image and GPS coordinates to fighter jets. This variant was cleared for operations in March 2021, after successfully completing the army's tactical evaluation in its second attempt. The German contribution to the NATO VJTF in 2023 is intended to include Pumas to this standard.

There are provisions for hard- or soft-kill systems to defeat hostile ATGMs or RPGs, or for future active/reactive armor. There are also mounts and interfaces for the inclusion of ATGMs on the right side of the turret.

The Puma's large weight reserves and the compact cabin make it very attractive for modification. Most vital integrals are situated in the front, floor, and side walls, which may remain unchanged during such a cabin-oriented modification.

On 28 June 2021, BAAINBw awarded the Rheinmetall-KMW joint venture PSM a EUR1.04 billion (US$1.23 billion) contract to upgrade 154 German Army Pumas to the S1 enhanced design status. The upgrade includes equipping the Puma with the Mehrrollenfähiges leichtes Lenkflugkörper-System (Multirole-capable Light Missile System: MELLS, the Bundeswehr's designation for the Spike-LR), integrating a turret-independent secondary weapon system, new digital radios, high-resolution day/night cameras for the driver and mounted squad, color-enabled optronics for the gunner and commander, and connecting the vehicle with the Infanterist der Zukunft - Erweitertes System (Future Soldier - Expanded System, IdZ-ES) and battle management system. The contract is scheduled for completion by 2029; an option to upgrade another 143 Pumas is included, which combined with the 40 already upgraded would bring all but 13 driver training vehicles in the German Army's inventory to S1-standard. That option was approved in December 2022.

In March 2022 the funding for a second batch of 229 Pumas of the latest standard was secured.

Eighteen Pumas took part in exercises in 2022, and all of them were inoperable at the end of the exercises. Major General von Butler, the commander of the 10th Armoured Division, described the situation as a "total failure." Consequently, the German government paused purchases of further Pumas. The manufacturer described the damage as "minor damage" which "was caused by the crew through improper operation".

In May 2023, another batch of 50 Pumas was ordered. In December 2025, the order was extended by 200 further vehicles to a total of 250 Pumas. Including the first production batch of 350, the German Army will thus have 600 Puma IFVs.

In August 2026, the first Puma S1 of the second batch was handed over the German BAAINBw to undergo trials at the WTD 81 and WTD 91. It features the improved MUSS 2.0 softkill system.

== Design ==
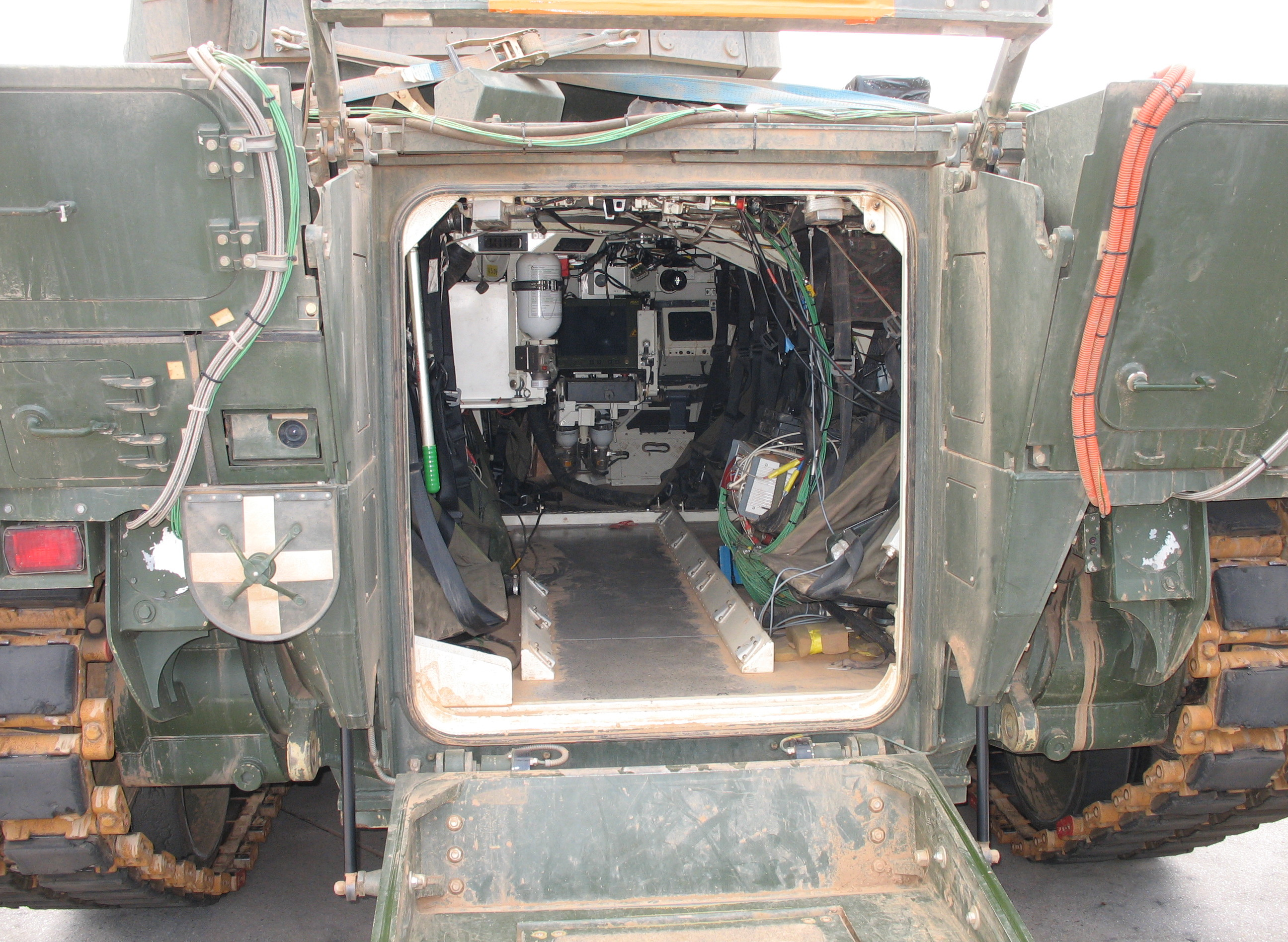
View of troop compartment

The Puma, while externally not very different from existing IFVs, incorporates a number of advances and state-of-the-art technologies. The most obvious of these is the incorporated ability to flexibly mount different armour (see below for details). Another feature is the compact, one-piece crew cabin that enables direct crew interaction ("face-to-face"; like replacing the driver or gunner in case of a medical emergency) and minimizes the protected volume. The cabin is air conditioned, NBC-proof with internal nuclear and chemical sensors and has a fire suppressing system using non-toxic agents. The engine compartment has its own fire extinguishing system. The only compromise of the otherwise nearly cuboid cabin is the driver station, located in a protrusion in front of the gunner, in front of the turret.

One measure to achieve the one-piece cabin is the use of an unmanned, double-asymmetrical turret (see photo): while slightly off-center turrets are common in IFVs, the Puma's turret is on the left-hand side of the vehicle, while the main cannon is mounted on the right side of the turret and thus on the middle axis of the hull when the turret is in the forward position.

The outer hull (minus the turret) is very smooth and low to minimize shot traps and the general visual signature. The whole combat-ready vehicle in its base configuration is air transportable in the Airbus A400M tactical airlifter. Its 3+6 persons crew capability is comparable to other vehicles of comparable weight, like the US American M2 Bradley IFV, the Marder, and the CV9040, but smaller than the 3+8 of the CV9030 and CV9035.

=== Armament ===
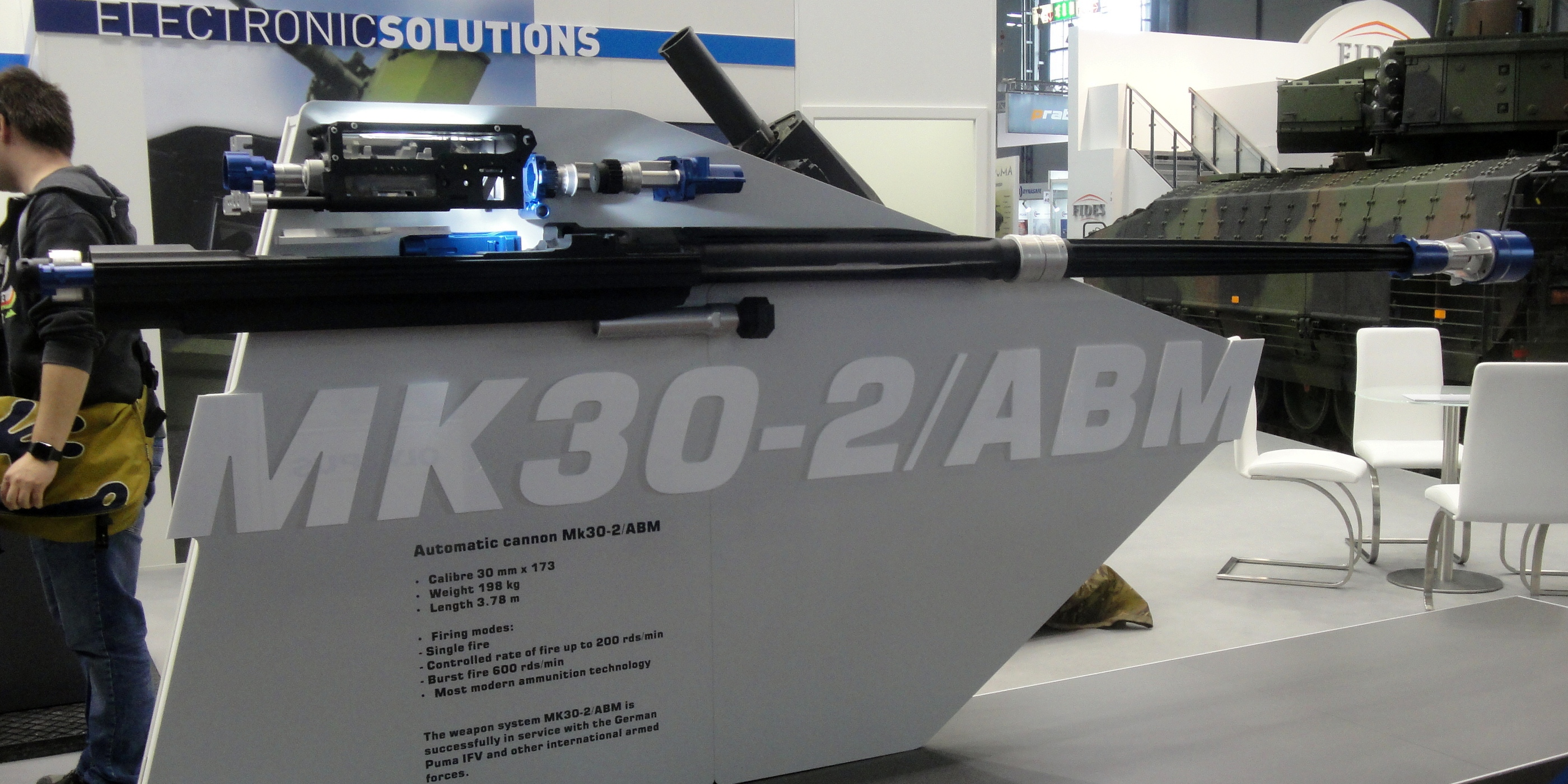
MK 30-2/ABM

==== Main gun ====
The primary armament of the Puma is a Rheinmetall 30 mm MK 30-2/ABM (Air Burst Munitions) autocannon, which has a rate of fire of 200 rounds per minute and an effective range of 3,000 m. The smaller 30×173mm cartridge offers major advantages over, for example, the Bofors 40 mm gun mounted on the CV9040 because of a much lower ammunition size and weight. The belt feed system provides a large number of rounds ready to fire, while the 40 mm offers only 24 shots per magazine. This is not a problem in a CV9040, but would force the Puma off the battlefield to reload the unmanned turret.

There are currently two ammunition types directly available via the autocannon's dual ammunition feed. One is a sub-calibre, fin-stabilised APFSDS-T (T for tracer), with high penetration capabilities, mainly for use against medium armoured vehicles. The second is a full-calibre, multi-purpose, Kinetic Energy-Timed Fuse (KETF) munition, designed with a fuse setting allowing air burst capability for ejecting a cone of sub-munitions. The ammunition type can be chosen shot-to-shot, as the weapon fires from an open bolt, with no cartridge inserted until the trigger is depressed. The ammunition capacity is 400 rounds; 200 ready to fire and 200 in storage.

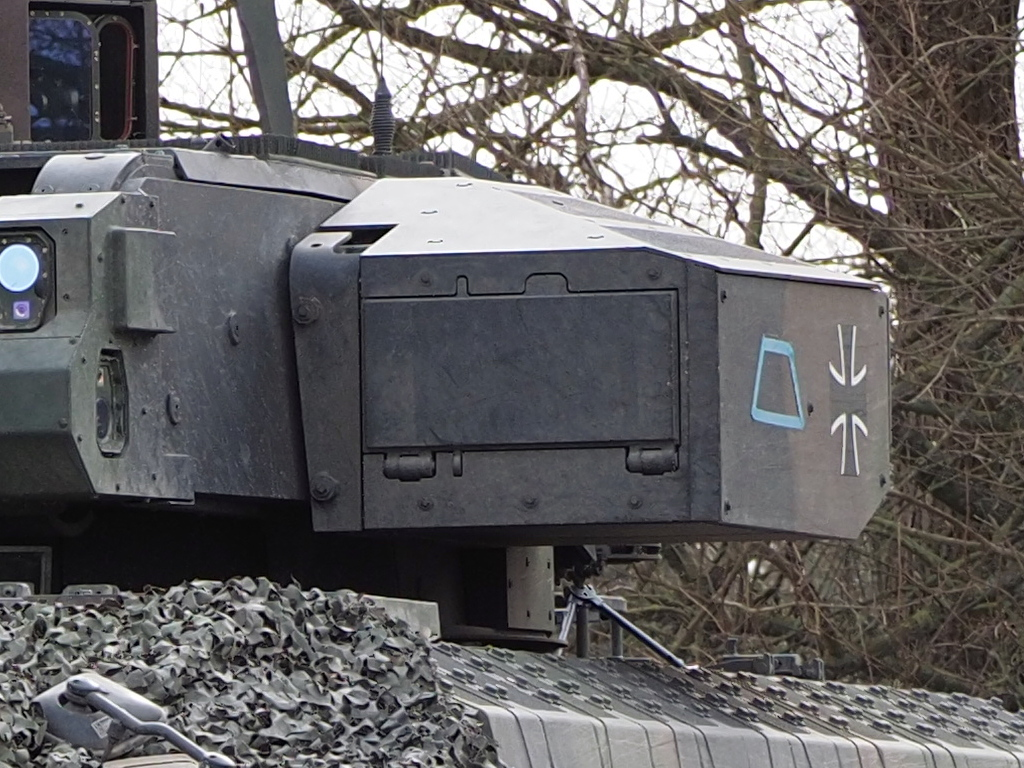
MELLS missile canister launcher

==== Anti-tank guided missile ====
To combat main battle tanks, helicopters, and infrastructure targets such as bunkers, the German Puma vehicles will be equipped with a turret-mounted EuroSpike Spike LR missile launcher, which carries two missiles. The Spike LR missile has an effective range up to 4,000 m and can be launched in either the "Fire and Forget" or "Fire and Observe" mode.

==== Machine gun ====
Keeping the weight within the 35-ton limit also led to a smaller calibre for the secondary armament, a coaxially mounted 5.56 mm HK MG4 machine gun firing at 850 rounds per minute and with an effective range of 1,000 m. The ammunition capacity is 2,000 rounds; 1,000 ready to fire and 1,000 in storage. While this is a smaller weapon than the western standard secondary armament (7.62 mm caliber MG), it offers the advantage that the crew can use the ammunition in their individual firearms. In situations where the lower range and penetration of the 5.56 mm rounds is an issue, the high ammunition load of the main gun enables the vehicle crew to use one or two main gun rounds instead. The gun housing can also host the 7.62 mm MG3.

==== Grenade launcher ====
In addition to the usual smoke-grenade launchers with 8 shots, there is a multishot 40 mm launcher at the back of the vehicle for close-in defence. The main back door can be opened halfway and enables two of the passengers to scout and shoot from moderate protection.

=== Protection ===
A high level of protection was one of the main priorities for the Puma; prior to its development, the ASCOD and CV90 were considered as potential alternatives by the German Army, but rejected for being unable to reach the required protection level even when heavily modified. Using a combination of specific design choices and specialized technologies, the Puma achieves a level of protection unreached by previous IFV designs. These include the relatively low silhouette of the hull, a modular armor concept, a small interior volume, an unmanned turret, redundant internal systems, interfaces for hardkill and softkill active protection systems, the separation of fuel from the crew compartment, the use of electrical rather than hydraulic turret and gun drives, and the isolation of ammunition in separate compartments with blow-out panels.

The whole crew, including the driver, and the dismount squad sit inside a single compartment, which enabled the German Army to reach a higher level of protection. For the driver, this means that there are safe ways to exit the vehicle if needed.

==== Passive protection ====
The Puma makes use of a modular armor concept, which means that additional protection modules can be adapted according to the desired level of protection. Initial plans were to offer three protection classes which are wholly or partly interchangeable. The protection class A is the basic vehicle, at 31.5 tonnes (31.0 long tons; 34.7 short tons) combat-ready weight air transportable in the A400M. The Puma utilizes Rheinmetall's AMAP-B composite armor for protection against kinetic energy threats and AMAP-SC for protection against shaped charges. The hull front is protected by the latter in form of spaced multi-layer armor, while ceramic armor is used on the sides.

In its baseline configuration, the Puma's frontal hull armor offers protection against medium caliber projectiles and shaped charge projectiles, while it can resist from heavy machine gun fire including the 14.5 mm Russian caliber all-around. Its frontal armor exceeds STANAG 4569 Level 6. The turret is only protected against HMG rounds in protection class A.

Protection class C is reached by fitting the baseline vehicle with additional armor modules on the side, turret and roof. The side armor covers almost the whole flanks of the vehicle and consist of a passive armor plate against KE rounds onto which explosive reactive armor and passive armor elements are mounted. The unmanned turret is supplemented with additional armor elements for protection against medium caliber rounds, while composite plates are installed on most of the vehicle's roof. It adds about 9 tonnes (8.9 long tons; 9.9 short tons) to the gross weight. With this add-on armor kit, the flanks of the Puma are up-armored to roughly the same level of protection as the hull front, protecting against medium caliber APFSDS ammunition, EFP mines and rocket-propelled grenades. The roof is able to withstand DPICM style bomblets with shaped charge warhead from artillery and mortar shells.

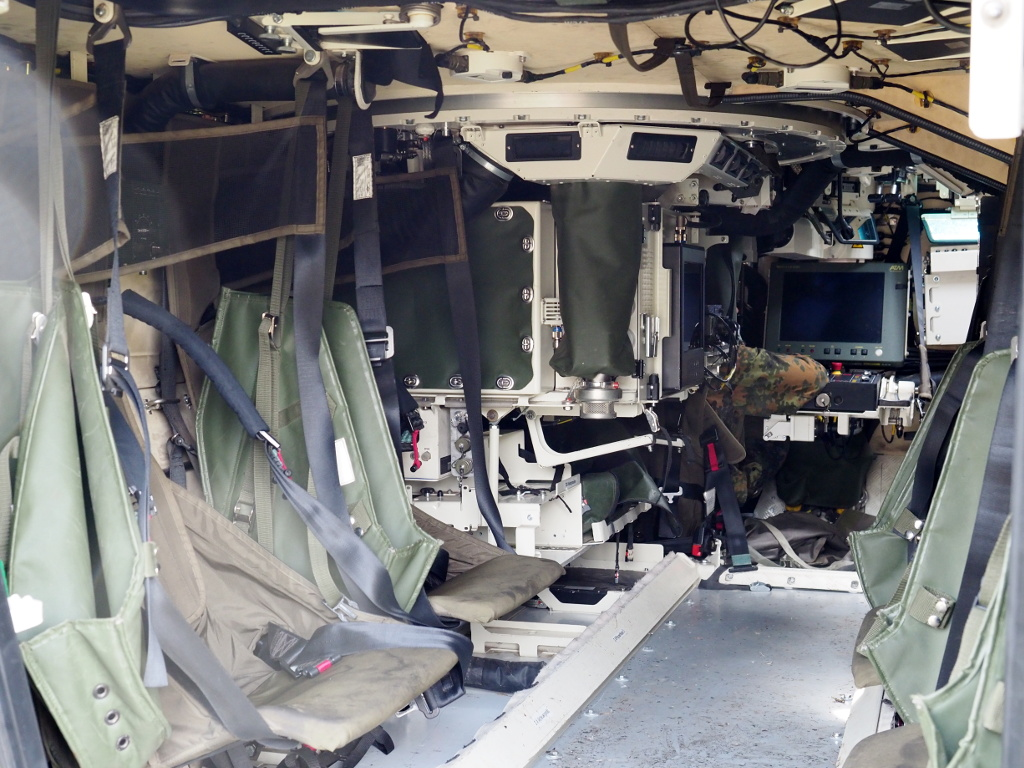
The seats and equipment inside the Puma IFV are decoupled from the floor to improve survivability in case of a mine strike

Originally, there was also a protection class B designed for transport by rail. However, it became obvious that class C lies within the weight and dimension limits for train/ship transportation, thus class B was scrapped. A group of four A400M aircraft could fly three class A Pumas into a theatre, with the fourth airplane transporting the class C armor kits and simple lifting equipment. The Pumas could be built-up to armor class C within a short time.

The whole vehicle is protected against heavy blast mines (up to 10 kg) and projectile forming charges from below, while still retaining 450 millimetres (18 in) ground clearance. Almost all equipment within the cabin, including the seats, has no direct contact to the floor, which adds to crew and technical safety. All cabin roof hatches are of the side-slide type, which make them easier to open manually, even when they are obstructed by debris. The running gear is decoupled and does not penetrate the crew compartment, preventing running gear parts from endangering the occupants in case of a mine strike. The exhaust is mixed with fresh air and vented at the rear left side. Together with a special IR-suppressing paint, this aims at reducing the thermal signature of the IFV.

==== Reactive armour ====
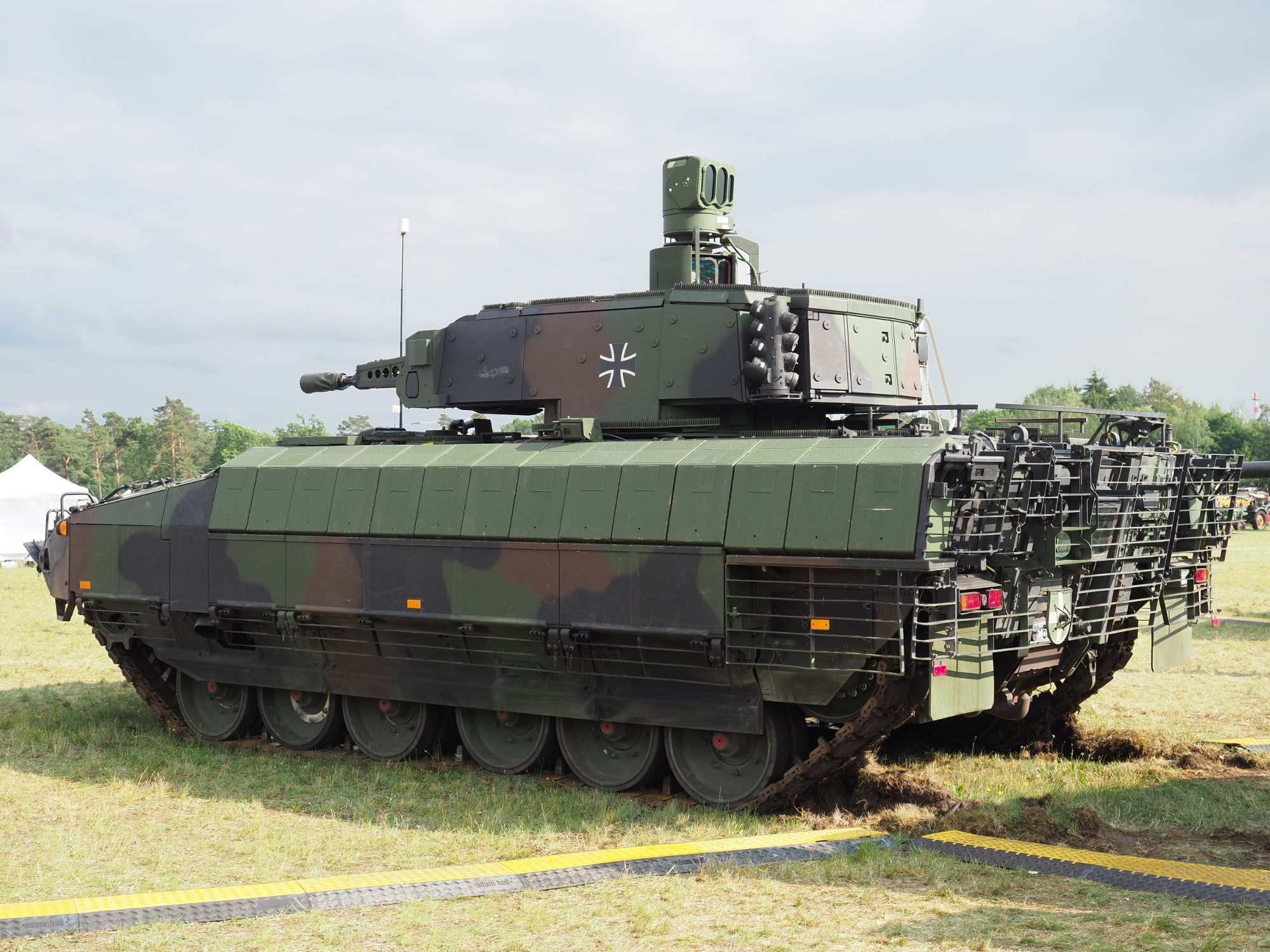
The ERA cassettes on this Puma are replaced with an inert training variant

As part of protection class C, the upper flanks of the Puma's hull are fitted with explosive reactive armor made by Dynamit Nobel Defence. Unlike other types of ERA, the system from DND does not include any metals, as these would endanger nearby soldiers in case of a detonation. Thus the Puma's ERA is rather made of lightweight composite materials, including the screws and outer cover. The explosive reactive armor only covers the upper portion of the hull sides, as ERA cassettes covering the lower section could be torn off by the detonation of mines and IEDs, which would result in a potential vulnerability when ambushed. Subsequently, the lower half of the Puma's flanks are protected by a composite armor solution developed by KNDS.

In December 2024, the parliament approved the production of a stockpile of reactive armour modules for the Puma. It was followed by a framework agreement between Dynamit Nobel Defence and the BAAINBw. This agreement enables the Bundeswehr to order ERA modules flexibly in case of operational needs.

==== Active Protection System ====
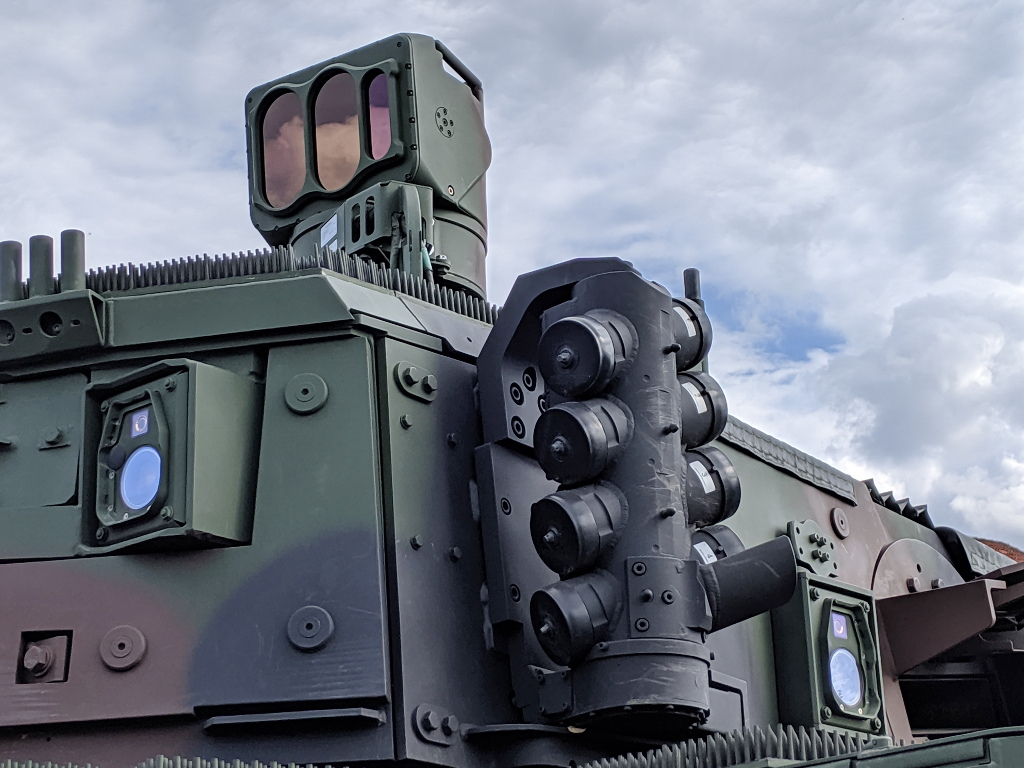
MUSS components: IR jammer, UV sensors, smoke grenades dispenser

The Pumas of the German Army are equipped with the Multifunktionales Selbstschutz-System (multifunction self protection system) softkill active protection system. MUSS is capable of defeating ATGMs using a jammer and multi-spectral smoke grenades. The system can detect incoming anti-tank guided missiles via its missile warners operating in the UV spectrum or detect the lasers used for rangefinding via its laser warning systems.

The second batch of Puma IFVs ordered by the German Army will be fitted with the improved MUSS 2.0, which can also act as hostile fire indicator and detect second generation laser rangefinder and laser beam riding missiles such as the Kornet ATGM.

==== Other protection features ====
The Puma features two fire suppression and extinguishing systems: one for the engine compartment and one for the crew compartment. The crew compartment is equipped with a modern NBC protection system, which is integrated with the air conditioning system. This system can use catalytic mechanisms to eliminate COX hazards. Sensors installed in the Puma IFV will automatically detect airborne chemical weapons.

A further crew safety measure is the location of the fuel tanks. They are placed outside of the vehicle hull itself, mounted heavily armoured within the running gear carriers. While this may expose the fuel tanks more to enemy fire, it is unlikely that both tanks will be penetrated at the same time, enabling the vehicle to retreat to a safer position in case of a breach. There is also a collector tank within the vehicle, which acts as a reserve tank in case of a double tank breach.

=== Sensors and situational awareness ===
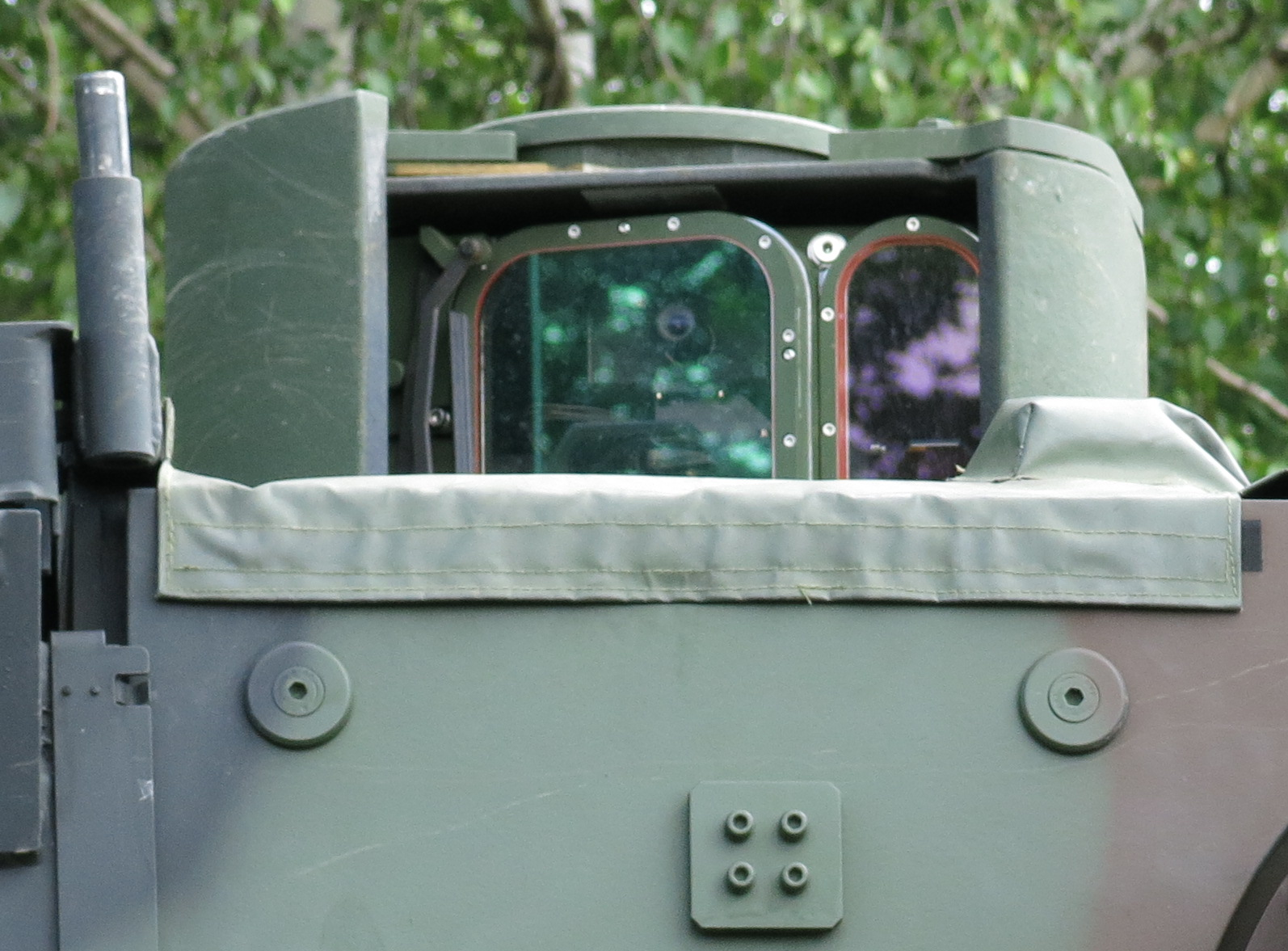
PERI sight for the commander.

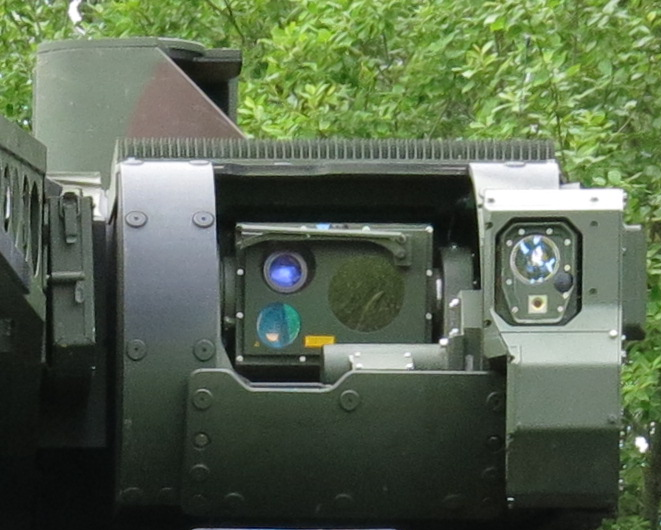
Gunner's sight in the center. On the right, the MUSS front sensor.

The Puma offers improvements in situational awareness. The fully stabilized 360° periscope (PERI RTWL by Hensoldt) with six different zoom stages offers a direct glass optic link to either the commander or the gunner. Since this is an optical line, it had to be placed in the turret center, one of the reasons why the main cannon is mounted off-center on the turret. Via an additional CCD camera the picture from this line can also be fed into the on-board computer network and displayed on all electronic displays within the vehicle. Besides that, the periscope offers an optronic thermal vision mode and a wide-angle camera with three zoom stages to assist the driver, as well as a laser range finder. The whole array is hunter-killer capable. The commander also has five vision blocks.

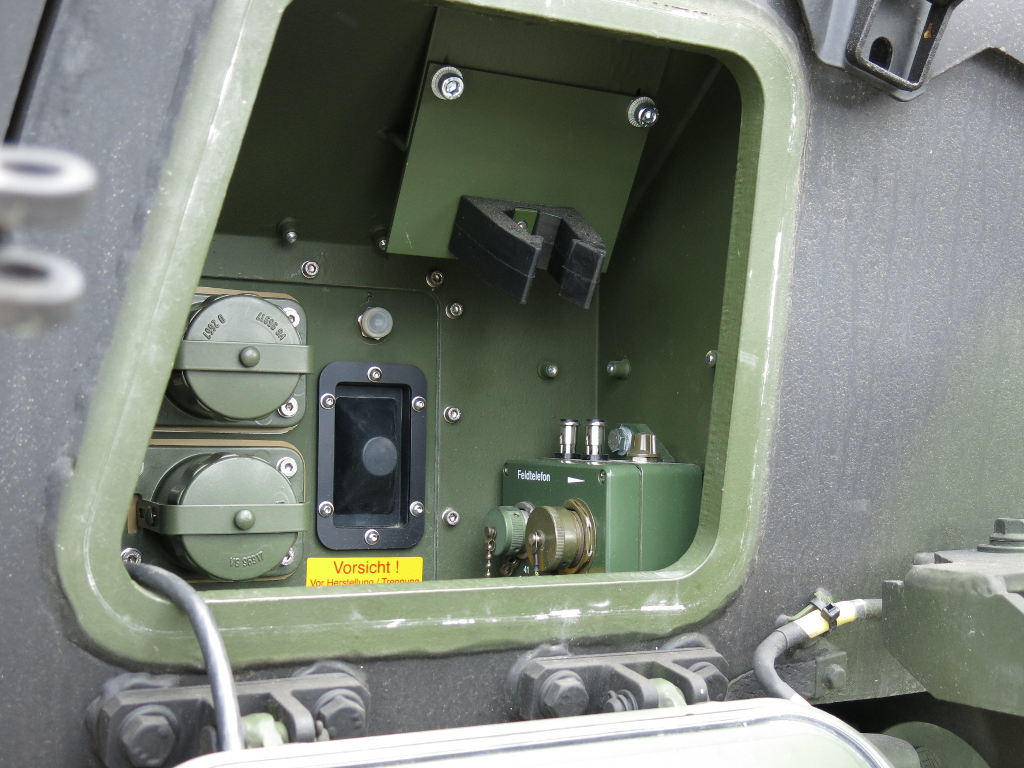
Intercom

The gunner optics, which can be completely protected with a slide hatch, are mounted coaxially to the main gun. The gunner has a thermal vision camera and laser range finder (identical to those on the PERI) and an optronic day sight, rounded off with a glass block. The driver has three of vision blocks, as well as an image intensifier and a display for optronic image feeds. The passenger cabin has a hatch and three vision blocks on the rear right side of the vehicle, one of them in a rotary mount. The rear cabin also has two electronic displays.

All in all, the Puma has an additional five external cameras at its rear in swing-mounts for protection while not in use. Apart from the glass optic periscope view directly accessible directly by the commander and gunner and indirectly via the CCD camera, all optronic picture feeds can be displayed on every electronic display within the vehicle. The provisions for the rear cabin enable the passengers to be more active than previously in assisting the vehicle crew either directly through the vision blocks and hatches, or by observing one or more optronic feeds. The whole crew has access to the onboard intercom.

R&S SOVERON handheld (HR) and vehicle (VR) radios have been commissioned to equip Pumas of the German element of Very High Joint Readiness Task Force 2023 (VJTF 2023).

=== Mobility ===
Traditionally, IFVs are expected to interact with main battle tanks (MBTs) on the battlefield. In reality, many IFVs are not mobile enough to keep up with the pace of an MBT. The Puma aims to close this gap with several key technologies. Firstly, its compact, lightweight MTU Diesel engine is unusually strong at 800 kilowatts (1,100 hp) nominal output. Even at the 43 tonnes (42 long tons; 47 short tons) maximum weight in protection class C, it has a higher power-to-weight ratio than the Leopard 2 MBT it is supposed to supplement.

The Puma prototypes had a decoupled running gear with five road wheels, and use a hydropneumatic InArm suspension from Horstmann to improve cross-country performance while reducing crew and material stress by limiting vibrations and noise. The road wheels were asymmetrical, mounted closer to each other at the front. This is to counter the front-heavy balance, inevitable because of the heavy frontal armor as well as the engine and drive train which are also situated at the front. The steel tracks made by KNDS Deutschland Tracks GmbH (formerly Diehl DST) are a 500 millimetres (20 in) wide new design, that is lighter than previous generation of DST tracks.

The serial production vehicles utilize KNDS' decoupled running gear but have six symmetrical arranged road wheels as shown on released pictures by the manufacturer.

In December 2023, 53 reserve engines were ordered as spare parts in order to enable the maintenance of the existing engine without decreasing the availability. The engine requires a general overhaul every 1,000 operating hours, after a mileage of 10,000 km or every ten years.

In December 2025, Renk received an order for 25 transmissions, and 188 were ordered in March 2026, to be delivered by 2030. MTU received an order for 200 new engines in March 2026.

== Operators ==
=== Current operator ===
Germany (350 active, 50 on order, option for 204 as of 2025)
The Puma has been in service with the German Army since April 2015.
Orders:
- First batch:
  - Order: 405 Puma ordered initially in July 2009 (€ 3 billion). The contract was amended the 11 July 2012 to reduce the order to 350 vehicles — 342 IFV and 8 driver training vehicles.
  - Retrofit of 337 Puma IFV to the S1 standard:
    - Contract for the retrofit of 40 Puma IFV, signed in July 2019 (€470 million).
    - Contract for the retrofit of 154 Puma IFV, signed in June 2021 (€ 1.04 billion).
    - Contract for the retrofit of 143 Puma IFV, signed in April 2023, all delivered by 2029 (€ 770 million).
    - Note: 5 of the Puma IFV won't be modernised, and will be used as driver training vehicles (total of 13).
- Second batch:
  - Order: 50 Puma S1 ordered in May 2023 (€ 1.1 billion), the delivery is planned for end-2025 to 2027.Note:
    - In March 2022 the German Army secured financing for the second batch which consisted of 229 Puma. But because of reliability issues, the order was paused and reconsidered.
    - In December 2025, the framework agreement was increased to 254 Puma, and the German Army got the approval to purchase 200 additional Puma.
      Note: to be ordered only under certain conditions (deficiencies addressed, the vehicle produced in the S1 standard have a reliable operational readiness, the changes are coordinated with the army and approved by them).

=== Potential orders ===
Germany
As of 2025, Germany plans a total of 1,087 Puma, 33 driver training vehicles, and 1,055 infantry fighting vehicles.
The Puma are planned in the S2 configuration.

=== Failed bids ===
Australia
The Australian Army sought a 'Mounted Close Combat Capability' within its Land 400 Phase 3 procurement program. The Puma IFV was one of the potential contenders. In November 2018, Project System & Management GmbH (PSM), the joint venture between Krauss-Maffei Wegmann and Rheinmetall announced the Puma would not compete in the Land 400 Phase 3 project.
Canada
The Department of National Defence was considering the purchase of vehicles meant to accompany the Leopard 2 into combat. The CV90, the Puma and the Véhicule blindé de combat d'infanterie were the most likely candidates for the role. A contract of 108, with an option for up to 30 more was looked at.
The project has since been cancelled.
Chile
Offered by the German Army to supplement the Leopard 2 and the possibility of manufacturing it under license by FAMAE, but the German offer didn't lead to any discussion for a purchase.
Croatia
In 2016, the Croatian Army was looking at replacing the 128 M80A IFV that were in its inventory. Several contenders were considered, including the CV90 and the Puma. 108 vehicles were expected (88 IFV, 8 command and control vehicles, 8 armoured ambulances, and 4 driving training vehicles). It was expected to be purchased from 2021.
For budget reasons, the Croatian Army settled on 89 M2A2 Bradley (ODS variant) for $145.3 million. The Croatian Army decided its purchase in 2020, and the contract was signed in January 2022. It includes 62 fully equipped and fully restored (M2A2 ODS), 5 for training, 22 for spare parts, they will be delivered in 2023–26.
Czech Republic
Czech Army is looking to buy 210 new infantry fighting vehicles for €2 Bln. between 2019 and 2024. All of them will replace aging BMP-2 in IFV and supporting variants. There will probably be an option to 100 more vehicles. In June 2017 five types of IFV (two versions of CV90, Lynx, ASCOD and Puma) were evaluated during a nine days testing.
Based on unofficial information from the Czech general staff, Puma might be selected based on its "technological superiority". In December 2018, Puma was shortlisted together with the ASCOD, CV90 and Lynx In October 2019 it was announced that the Puma was being withdrawn from the competition. The manufacturer said that the Czech Army requirements would require an expensive redesign to the existing Puma which it was unwilling to undertake.
The Czech army selected the CV9030 MkIV in July 2022 and signed the contract in December 2022.
Hungary
The Hungarian Defence Forces was looking to buy 200 new infantry fighting vehicles between 2020 and 2026. All of them were to replace the aging BTR-80 APCs. Eventually the Hungarian government decided on the Lynx.
United States
The United States Army sought a new family of vehicles to replace the aging fleet of M113 APCs and M2 Bradleys with the BCT Ground Combat Vehicle Program. With modification, the Puma satisfied the technical requirements of the BCT Ground Combat Vehicle Program and was offered by SAIC and Boeing. The SAIC-Boeing team was not awarded a technology development contract for their Puma-based vehicle in August 2011, and then filed a protest. The protest was denied in December 2011 based on concerns over the vehicle's force protection features, primarily the proposed active protection system and underbody armor, and 20 significant weaknesses which had potential solutions offered that were judged as inadequate. On 2 April 2013, the Congressional Budget Office released a report that advised purchasing current infantry fighting vehicles instead of developing a new vehicle for the GCV program. Buying the Puma would save $14.8 billion, and was called the most capable vehicle. The Army responded by saying no existing vehicle could match requirements to replace the Bradley.

== See also ==
- ASCOD – (Spain, Austria)
  - ASCOD 2 – (Austria, Spain)
    - Ajax – (United Kingdom)
- Borsuk IFV – (Poland)
- M2 Bradley – (United States)
- Combat Vehicle 90 – (Sweden)
- Lynx – (Germany)
- Dardo IFV – (Italy)
- K21 – (South Korea)
  - AS21 Redback – (South Korea)
- ZBD-04 – (China)
- Type 89 IFV – (Japan)
- Kurganets-25 – (Russia)
- Makran IFV – (Iran)
- Tulpar IFV – (Turkey)
- Hunter AFV – (Singapore)
