= Nexeya =

French defence contractor

Nexeya Society
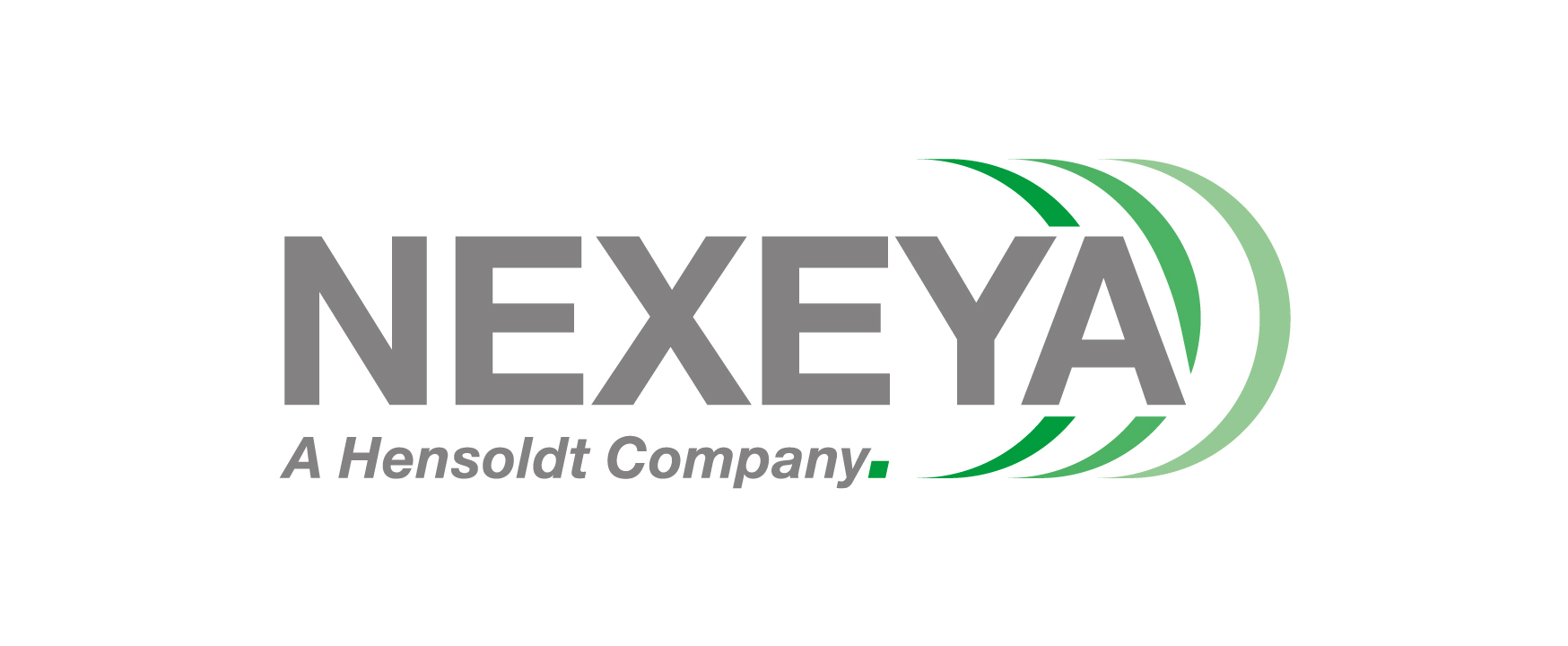
- Company type: Société par actions simplifiée
- Industry: Electronic equipment
- Founded: 1997; 29 years ago
- Headquarters: Toulouse, France
- Key people: Jérôme Giraud (CEO)
- Products: Test and integration solutions, Mission management systems, Power conversion, Customer support
- Revenue: €125.50 million (2017-2018)
- Owner: Hensoldt
- Number of employees: 620 (2018-2019)
- Website: http://www.nexeya.com

Nexeya is a French company specialising in the design and development of electronic equipment for the aeronautics, defence, energy, rail, and aerospace sectors. With more than 800 employees, its primary establishments are located in Toulouse, Massy (Essonne) and La Couronne (Charente). In 2019, the company became a subsidiary of the German company Hensoldt. Space and defense activities have, however, been retained in a new company, called Hemeria, which employs 200 people and has a turnover of €36 million.

== History ==
Created in 1997 under the name Eurilogic, Nexeya gradually increased its revenue thanks to both internal growth and external acquisitions. Its activities focus on the aeronautics, defence, aerospace, energy, and transport sectors. The company's development can be split into 3 phases :

- 1997 to 2007 - growth based on the provision of industrial services;
- 2007 to 2013 - eight acquisitions, including Isis MPP and BTS Industries, which granted Nexeya access to technologies and expertise allowing them facilitated access to major industrial programmes;
- 2013 onwards - the acquisition of companies in Canada and Germany and the sale of two non-core business activities in order to accelerate growth.

In July 2017, Nexeya management became a majority shareholder of the firm, holding 75% of its capital.

== Activities ==
=== Naval defence ===
Nexeya provides products and services related to combat and navigation systems. The French Navy has outfitted its surveillance frigates with Lyncea (formerly Sitac), Nexeya's embedded CMS system, which allows for the creation and monitoring of a tactical situation in order to combat piracy, drug trafficking, and illegal immigration.

=== Aeronautics ===
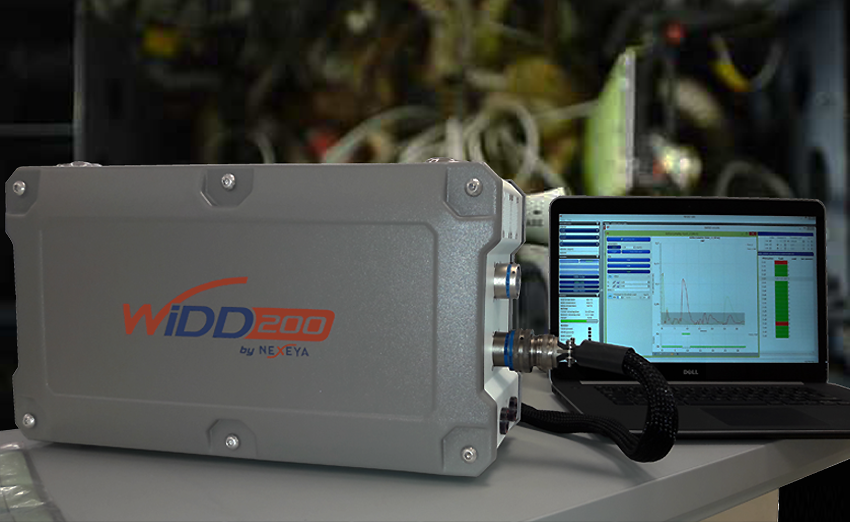
WIDD is a system that detects permanent and intermittent wiring defects and is used in the workshop.

Nexeya designs products for the testing of aircraft avionics and electrical systems (validation, integration, fault detection, etc.) as well as specific equipment for assembly lines. Nexeya designed a WiDD wiring tester that performs an automatic multipoint check of cable harnesses in order to detect and locate permanent or intermittent defects.

=== Energy ===
Nexeya develops and manufactures hydrogen-based energy storage and recovery products in order to offset the intermittent availability of renewable energy. Most notably, Nexeya designed a hydrogen energy storage station to both supply and make self-sufficient a tertiary sector building in Grand Angoulême (Charente).

=== Space ===
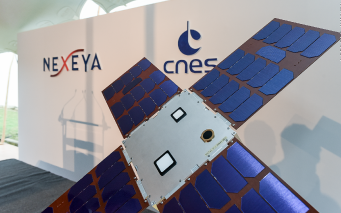
Nanosatellite - launch of the Angels project with CNES

This activity was partly sold in April 2019 to the new company Hemeria. Nexeya developed the Hemeria range of nanosatellites. Angels, the first French industrial nanosatellite from this range, developed with the Cnes, will be put into orbit in late 2019.

Nexeya will also be supplying Kineis with 20 nanosatellites for the first European nanosatellite satellite constellation dedicated to the Internet of things.

Nexeya has also invested in the Rennes-based start-up Unseenlabs, along with the Direction générale de l'armement (DGA), BPI France, and Breizh Up, for an innovative maritime surveillance project employing nanosatellites.

== Revenue ==
During the fiscal year ending June 2018, the group, which employs 825 people, generated a turnover of €125,500,000.
