= Hensoldt =

German defense and aerospace company

Hensoldt AG
- Type: Public (Aktiengesellschaft)
- Traded as: FWB: HAG; MDAX Component
- Industry: Defence, electronics, aerospace
- Predecessor: Airbus DS Electronics and Border Security
- Founded: February 28, 2017; 9 years ago
- Headquarters: Taufkirchen, Munich, Upper Bavaria, Bavaria, Germany
- Area served: worldwide
- Key people: Oliver Dörre (CEO)
- Products: Electronic equipment, avionics, radars, telecommunications equipment, software
- Revenue: ▲€1.47 billion (2021)
- Operating income: ▲€−14 million (2021)
- Net income: ▲€−36 million (2021)
- Total assets: ▼€2.76 billion (2021)
- Total equity: ▼€1.86 billion (2021)
- Owner: German government (25.1%); Leonardo S.p.A. (22.8%); Public float (52.1%)
- Number of employees: 6,316 (December 2021)
- Divisions: Hensoldt Sensors, Hensoldt Optronics, GEW Technologies, EuroAvionics Holding, Kelvin Hughes, Nexeya
- Website: hensoldt.net

Hensoldt AG (stylized in all caps) is a German multinational corporation headquartered in Munich which focuses on sensor technologies for protection and surveillance missions in the defence, security and aerospace sectors. The main product areas are radar, optoelectronics and avionics. Hensoldt's main office is in Taufkirchen near Munich, Germany.

On 25 September 2020, Hensoldt AG was listed in the Prime Standard of the Frankfurt Stock Exchange at an issue price of 12.00 euros. Based on the issue price, the market capitalisation amounted to 1.26 billion euros.

== History ==
The company originated from the electronics business unit of the defence division of the Airbus. At the end of February 2017, Airbus sold this business unit to the US financial investor KKR for 1.1 billion euros. Since December 2020, the government of Germany holds a minimum share, which is managed by the Federal Ministry of Defence (BMVg).

Since 2017, the company has been known as Hensoldt. The company's name can be traced back to Moritz Carl Hensoldt (1821–1903), a German pioneer of optics and precision mechanics in the 19th century. In 1852, he founded an optical workshop for telescopes, astronomical equipment and microscopes.

In 2019, news agency Reuters reported that KKR was in the process of preparing for a listing of 20-30% on the stock exchange or a sale of Hensoldt.

In 2023, Hensoldt acquired defence systems integrator ESG Elektroniksystem for an enterprise value of 675 million euros ($727.79 million), along with an earn-out of up to 55 million euros.

In June 2026 Hensoldt completed its acquisition of Nedinsco, a Venlo-based Dutch optronics specialist (periscopes, driver-vision optics), folding the ~140-person firm into its Optronics division.

== Corporate structure ==
The Hensoldt Group's holding structure includes the following direct and indirect operating subsidiaries (as of September 2019):

- Hensoldt Sensors GmbH, Taufkirchen, Germany
- Hensoldt Optronics GmbH, Oberkochen, Germany
- Hensoldt UK Ltd., Enfield, United Kingdom. Formerly Kelvin Hughes
- Hensoldt SAS, Plaisir, France
- Nexeya SAS, Châtenay-Malabry, France
- EuroAvionics Holding GmbH, Pforzheim, Germany
- Hensoldt Australia Pty Ltd, Canberra, Australia. Formerly IE Asia-Pacific Pty Ltd.
- Hensoldt South Africa, Pretoria, South Africa. Formerly Hensoldt Optronics (Pty) Ltd. and GEW Technologies (Pty) Ltd.
- Hensoldt Pvt Ltd, Bengaluru, India
- Hensoldt Inc., Vienna, Virginia, United States
- Hensoldt Netherlands, Rotterdam, The Netherlands

== Activities ==
=== Radar ===
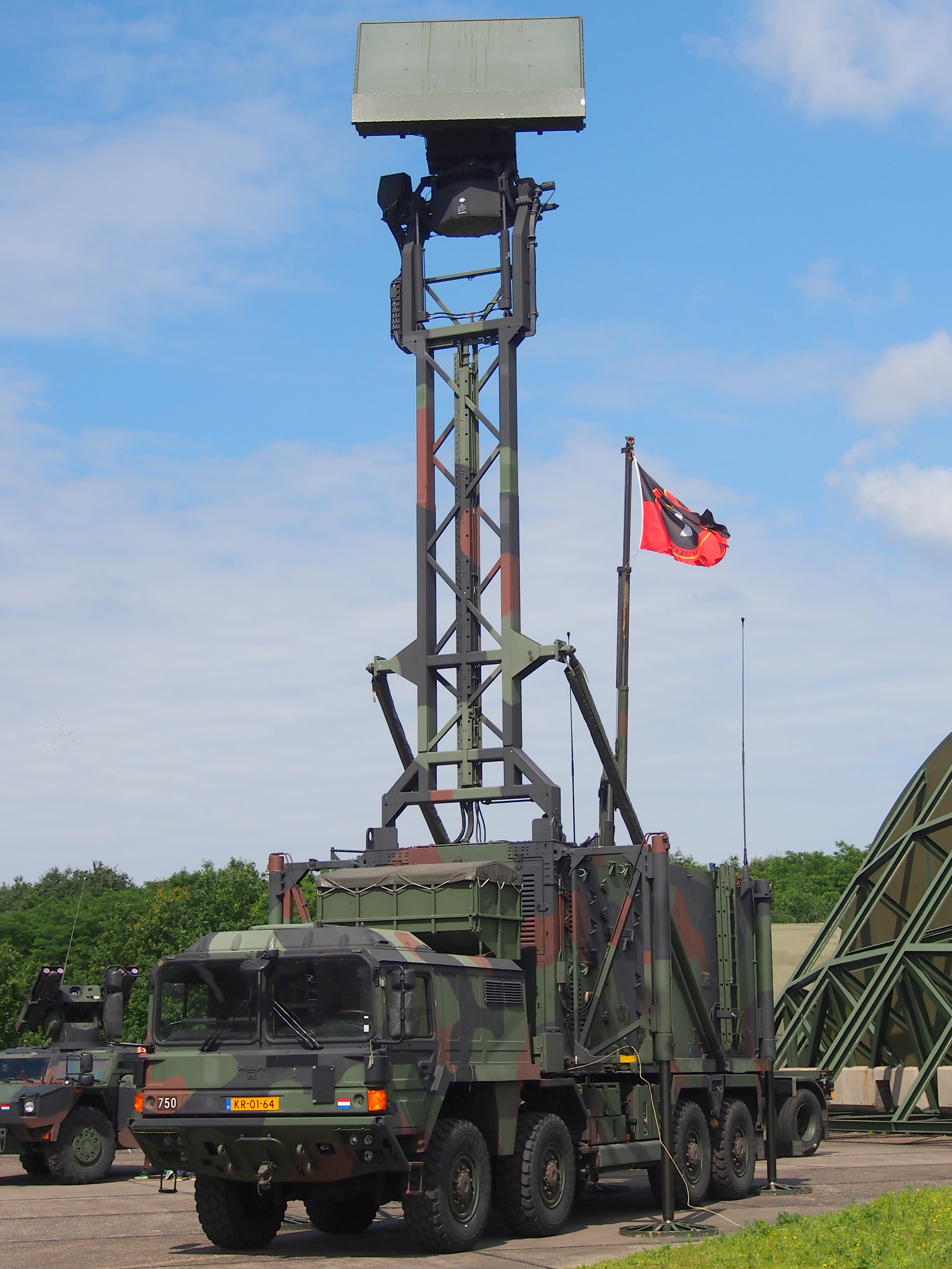
Hensoldt TRML-3D radar

Hensoldt develops and manufactures radar systems for the purposes of surveillance, reconnaissance, air traffic control and air defence. These radars are used on such platforms as the Eurofighter, the German Navy's F125 frigates and the US Navy's littoral combat ships and ground-based systems. In September 2017, Hensoldt acquired the British radar manufacturer Kelvin Hughes from the private equity firm ECI.

Ground based air defense sensors include TRML-3D and TRML-4D active radar and TwInvis passive radar. Hensoldt claims to have detected two F-35 fighter jets as they were leaving from the ILA Berlin Air Show in 2018 with their passive TwInvis radar system. Naval air defense radars include TRS-3D and TRS-4D in fixed panel and rotator variants.

=== Optronics ===
Hensoldt manufactures optical and optronic devices for military and civil security applications. The main components of these devices are daylight cameras, thermal imagers, image intensifiers and laser rangefinders. The systems are used on various platforms for air, ground, sea and space missions as well as for the protection of infrastructures and borderlands. The optronic systems are used on board the Puma infantry fighting vehicle, Leopard main battle tank, 212 and 209 type submarines, Gripen and Rafale combat aircraft, AHRLAC reconnaissance aircraft, Baykar TB2 UAV, the Camcopter, Diamond DA42, and the EDRS-A satellite. In addition to this, Hensoldt also manufactures sights, targeting optics and optical systems deployed in the Leopard 2 main battle tank, PzH 2000 self-propelled howitzer, NH90 and Tiger transport and combat helicopters, as well as in the “Future Soldier” programme for modernising the infantry of the Bundeswehr, the German Armed Forces.

=== Avionics ===
The main system manufactured is the Sferion Pilot Assistance system, which allows for safe flight operations in a degraded visual environment. Products also include situational awareness systems, military mission computers and flight data recorders for helicopters and fighter aircraft. The company has set up the air traffic control network of the German Air Force, covering an airspace of 1,700 x 1,500 kilometres, by equipping airports used by the air force with ASR-S surveillance radar. Further air traffic control radars by Hensoldt are under contract for Great Britain, Australia and Canada. In August 2017, Hensoldt acquired the German-based company EuroAvionics GmbH, a supplier of civil avionics systems for helicopters and UAVs.

=== Electronic warfare ===
Hensoldt's product portfolio for electronic warfare includes 'Kalaetron' family of airborne electronic warfare system, including "Kalaetron Attack" aimed at jamming enemy radars. The company is also a manufacturer of systems for acquiring and analysing radar and radio signals as well as equipments which offer protection for convoys and individual vehicles from attacks by improvised explosive devices (IED). The company developed MUSS, an operational electronic self-protection system for armored vehicles, which is integrated into the German Armed Forces’ Puma infantry fighting vehicle.

== Controversies ==
In October 2018, the German government imposed a ban on arms exports to Saudi Arabia, citing the assassination of Jamal Khashoggi. However, in September 2022, reports revealed that despite the government embargo, Hensoldt continued to sell arms to the Arab nation. In 2019, the firm indulged in a deal for the establishment of a joint venture with the Kingdom's state-owned arms manufacturer, Saudi Arabian Military Industries (SAMI). The German firm also used its subsidiaries in the United Kingdom, France and South Africa to continue supplying arms to Riyadh, as the foreign branches were not subjected to the German arms embargo. In 2020, Saudi required radars for its border with Yemen, where the United Arab Emirates and Saudi-led coalition were waging a deadly war. While hundreds of thousands of people, including civilians, died in the Yemen war, Hensoldt's boards members were in talks to win the contract. Moreover, Hensoldt had been acting as a subcontractor, supplying components to Spanish and French manufacturers, who continued the arms exports to Saudi Arabia.
