= MUSS (countermeasure) =

Soft kill active protection system

Multifunktionales Selbstschutz-System
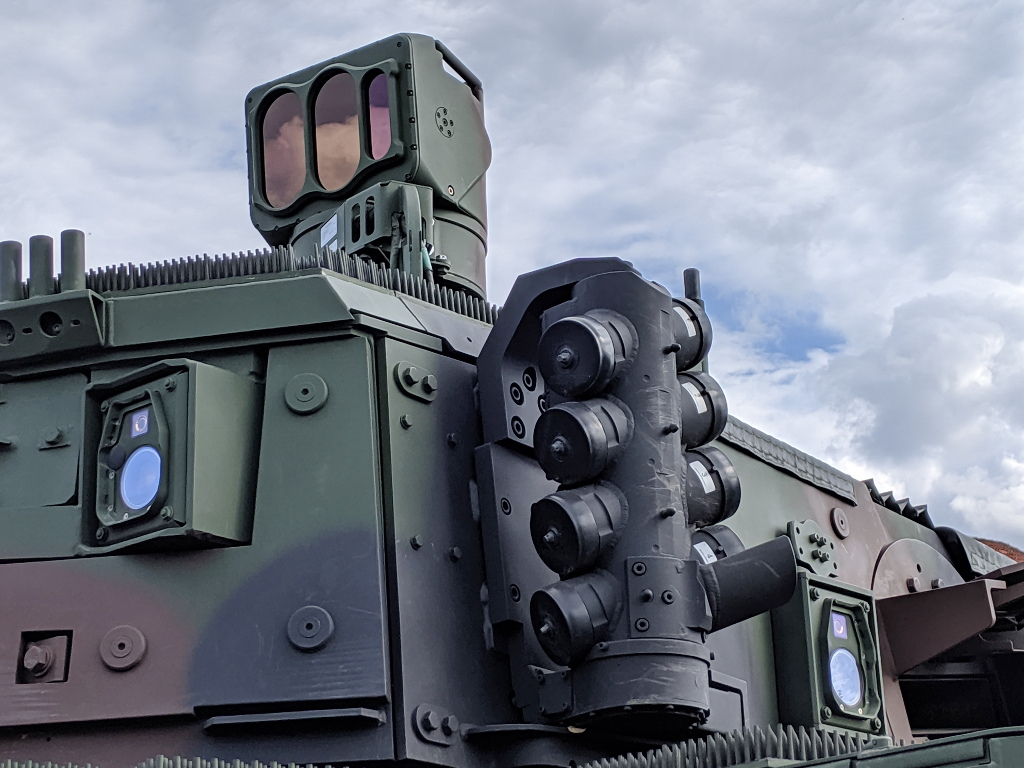
- MUSS components: infrared jamming device (top), ultraviolet warning sensors (left and right) and smoke grenade dispenser (centre) on a German Puma IFV

Service history
- Used by: German Army

Production history
- Designer: Hensoldt
- Designed: 1990s
- Manufacturer: Hensoldt
- Produced: after 2006
- Variants: MUSS; MUSS 2.0; ODAEON

Specifications
- Mass: 65–150 kilograms (143–331 lb)

Multifunctional Self protection System (MUSS, German: Multifunktionales Selbstschutz-System) is a soft kill active protection system developed to protect military vehicles against guided anti-tank missiles.

== History ==
MUSS was developed by EADS, Buck (a Rheinmetall subsidiary) and Krauss-Maffei Wegmann (KMW). Before September 2003, it was tested on a Leopard 2 tank by the German Bundesamt für Wehrtechnik und Beschaffung.

The German Puma infantry fighting vehicle has been equipped with MUSS, after EADS was awarded a contract in 2006. Hensoldt delivered the 300th MUSS active protection system to the German Army on 19 September 2019. A total of 342 MUSS systems were delivered by 2020.

In July 2016, the UK's Defence Science and Technology Laboratory placed a £7.6 million contract with QinetiQ to evaluate the MUSS system for armoured vehicles, particularly the Challenger 2 main battle tank.

== MUSS ==
MUSS consists of three main elements: the sensor units, detecting incoming threats, the computer unit for processing the informations and the countermeasures used to engage them. The sensors are called MUSS Sensor Heads (MSHs) by Hensoldt and operate completely passive. and utilize the PMILDS sensor, a variant of the AN/AAR-60 Missile Launch Detection System (MILDS) in combination with an additional laser warner. The MSH's missile warner detects missiles by spotting the missile plume in the ultraviolet spectrum to prevent possible interference from the sun.

The MUSS Central Electronics (MCE), i.e. the computer unit, processes the informations from the MSHs and engages the electronic or pyrotechnic countermeasures (for example an infrared jamming device), after a missile has been detected or the laser warners have been actuated. The current version of MUSS uses a combination of two countermeasures: an IR and UV jammer and smoke grenade dischargers, typically mounted on rotatable rails. The IR jammer is called the MUSS Jammer Head (MJH) by Hensoldt and sends false infrared guidance signals when engaged, interfering with the guidance systems of most SACLOS ATGMs, by making the guidance unit track the IR jammer instead of the missile. This leads to the generation of incorrect guidance signals. The smoke grenade dischargers are also known as RiWA (richtbare Nebelmittelwurfanlagen) and create a screen of multi-spectral smoke, which blocks the visible and IR spectrum of light. This allows the system to also protect against IR-guided projectiles and fire-and-forget missiles with IR seeker. In case of the German Puma IFV, two four-tube RiWAs are installed at the rear of the turret.

MUSS offers 360° protection with elevation up to 70° and can handle up to four threats at once. Depending on application the weight of the system can vary between 65 and 160 kg.

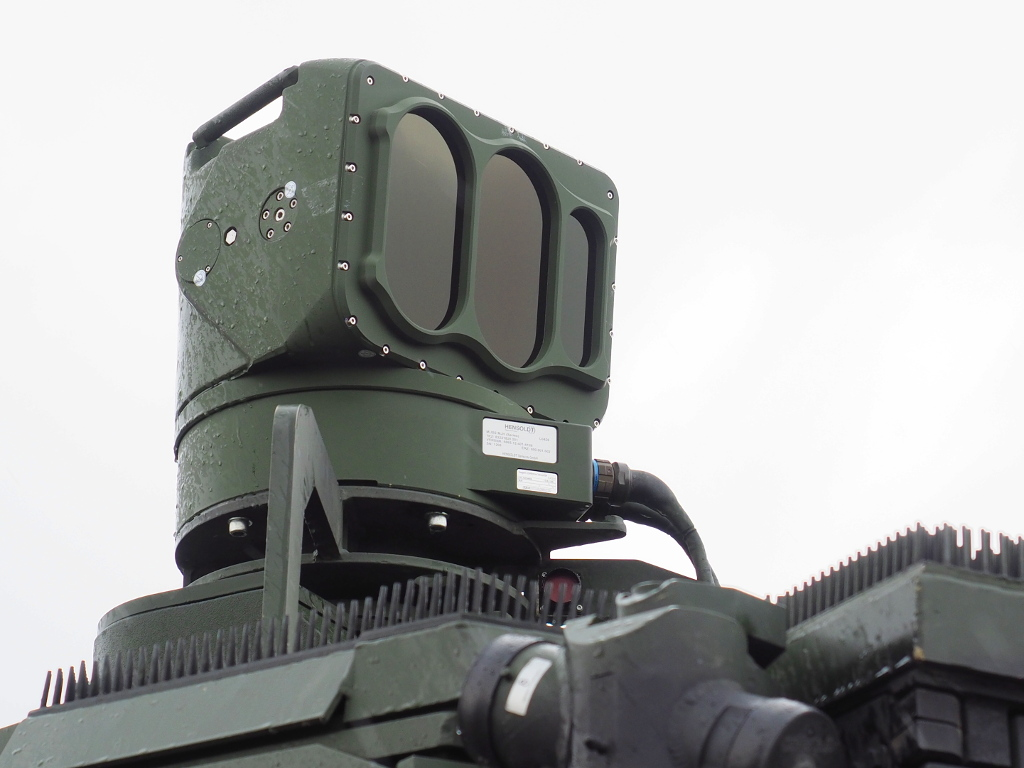
The MUSS Jammer Head mounted on top of a Puma IFV

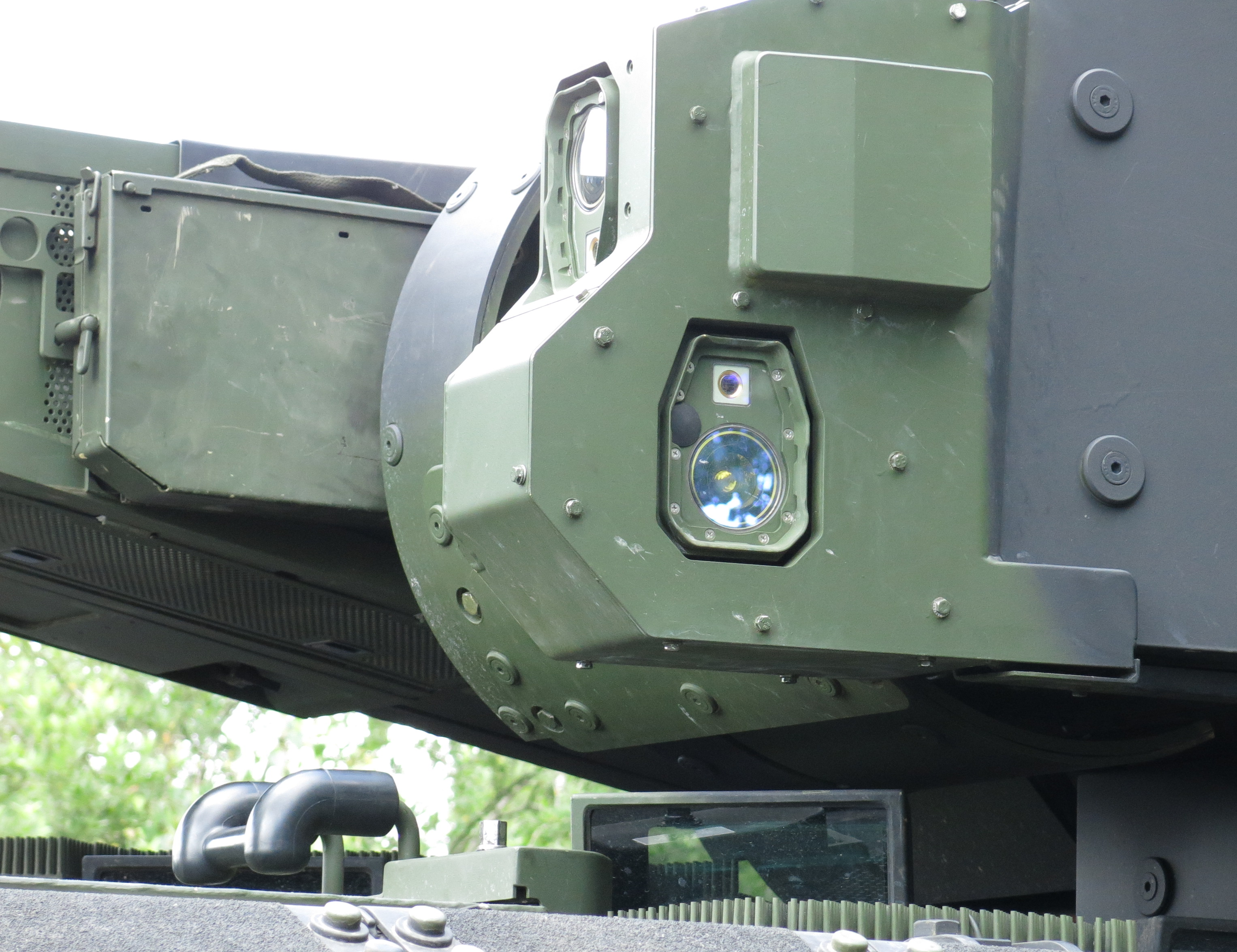
Front and left MSHs on the turret of a Puma IFV

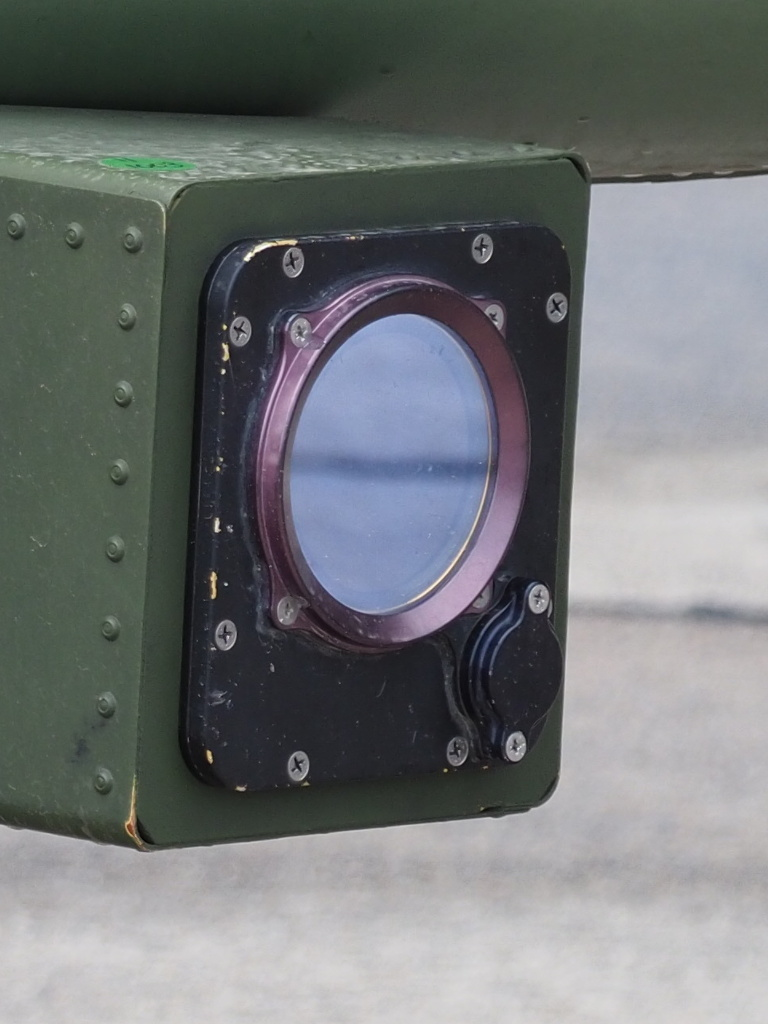
A Tiger's AN/AAR-60 MILDS sensor. The MSH is derived from it

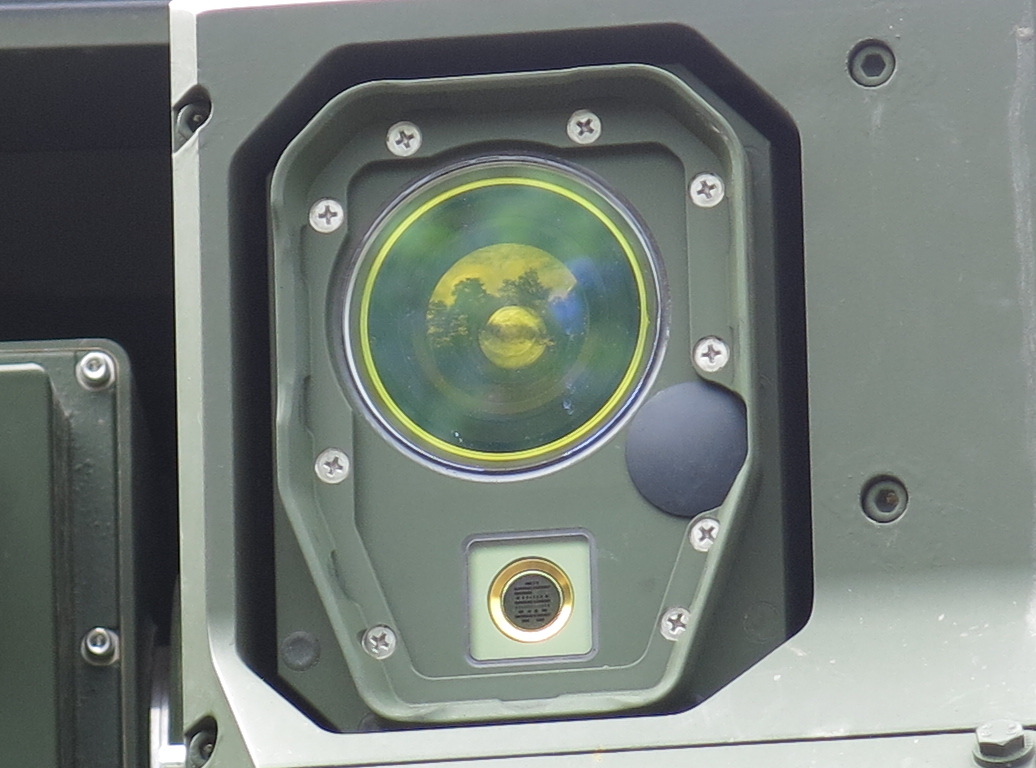
Close-up of a MUSS Sensor Head

== MUSS 2.0 ==
In November 2021, Hensoldt announced the development of an improved version known as "MUSS 2.0". The development of MUSS 2.0 was commissioned by the Federal Office of Bundeswehr Equipment, Information Technology and In-Service Support and includes optimizations in regards to size and weight while improving the capabilities of the missile warners and laser detectors. MUSS 2.0 can also detect second-generation laser rangefinders, laser beam riding missiles such as Kornet and can act as hostile fire indicator. It is compliant to the NATO Generic Vehicle Architecture (NGVA).

In August 2024, the Fraunhofer-Institut für Kommunikation, Informationsverarbeitung und Ergonomie presented an additional sensor module for MUSS 2.0 that has been developed in cooperation with Hensoldt. The sensor module uses a total of 120 MEMS microphones to detect the noises generated by the propellers of drones, determining azimuth and elevation to the drone. The sensor module is dodecagonal shaped like the base of the MUSS Jammer Head 2.0 and can be mounted below it.

MUSS 2.0 has been showcased on the KF51-U main battle tank and the Boxer RCT30. It is being procured by the German Army on the second batch of Puma IFVs.

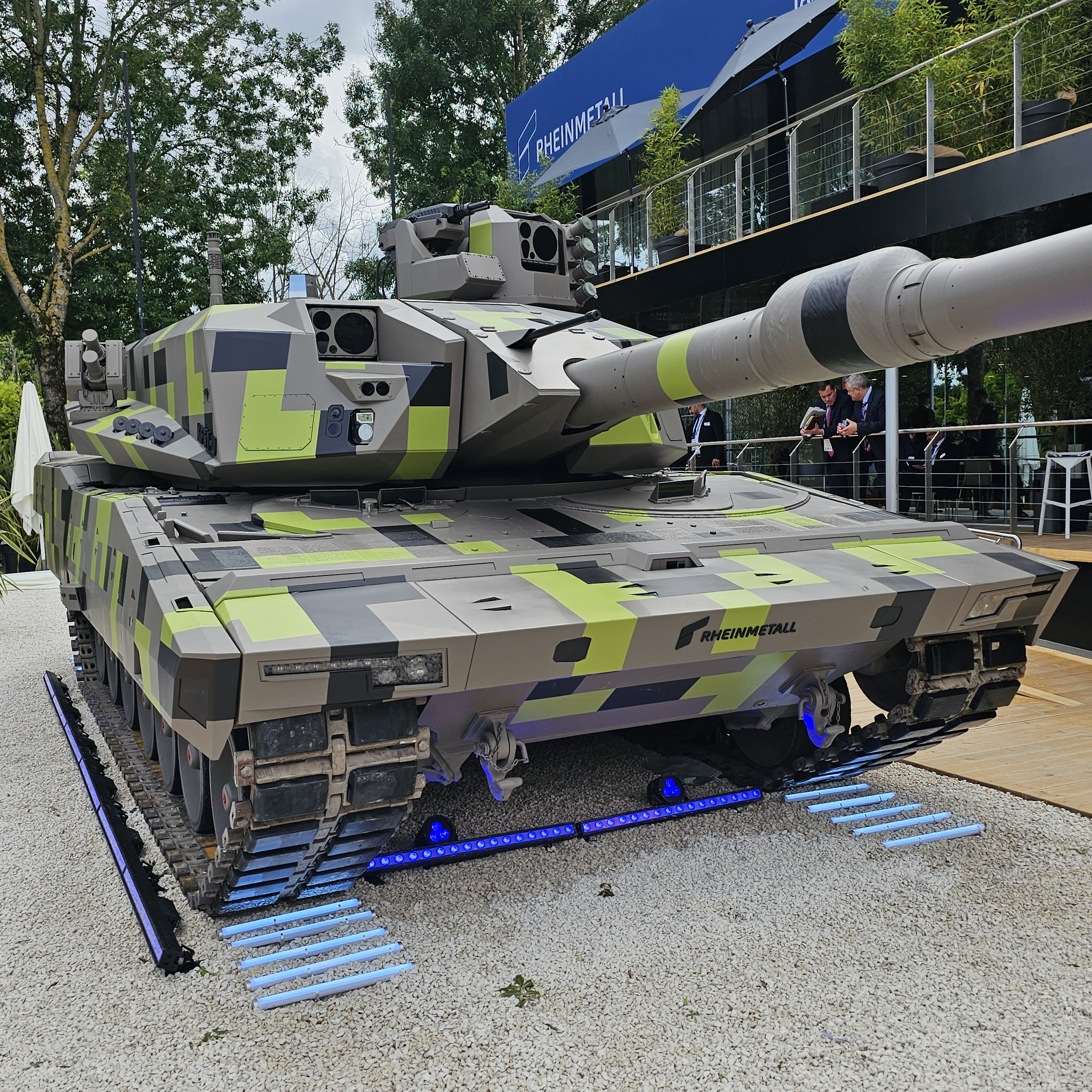
KF51-U Panther with MUSS 2.0, Iron Fist and StrikeShield

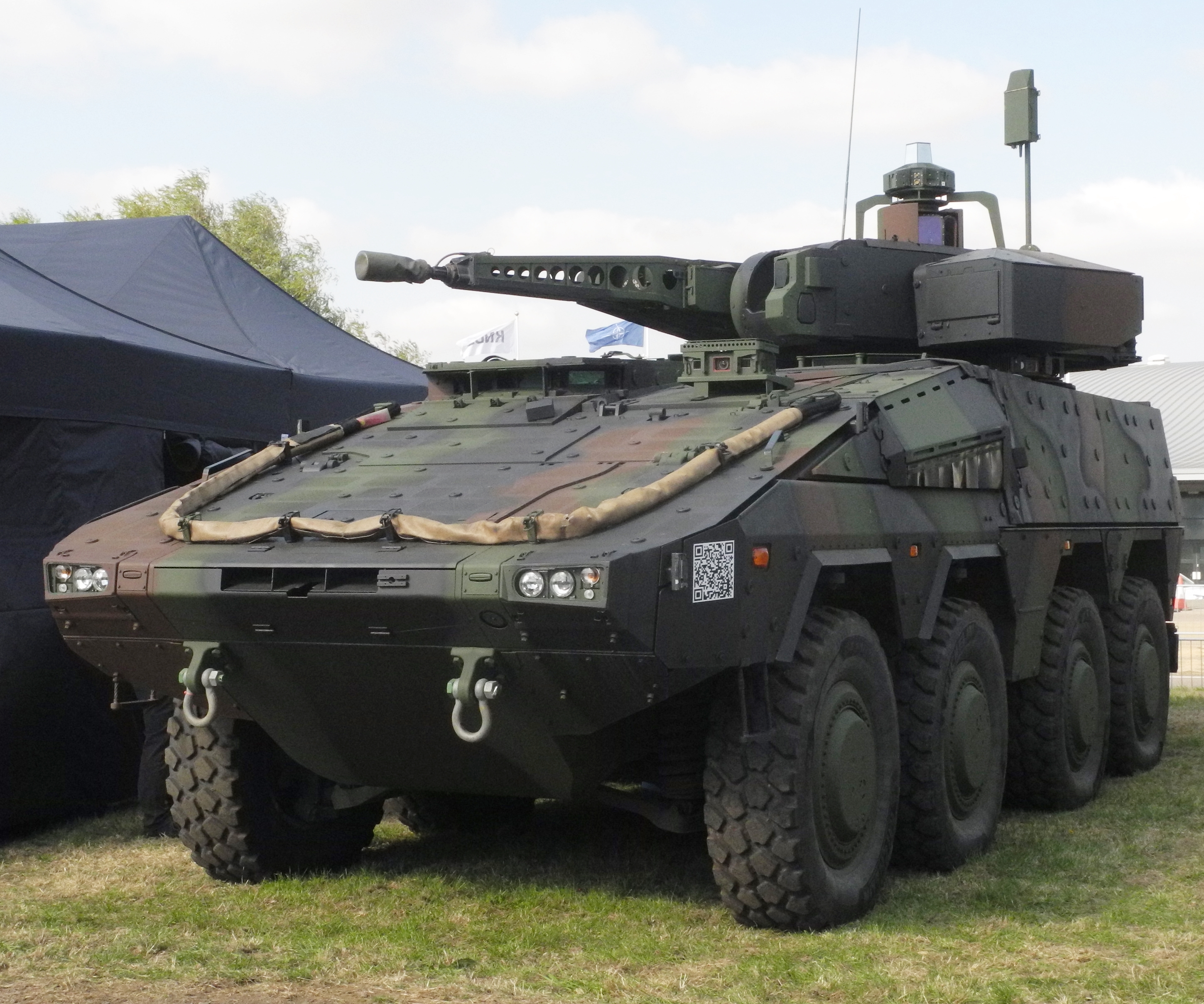
Boxer RCT30 with MUSS 2.0

== ODAEON ==
In February 2025, Hensoldt announced that it had been awarded a €17.6 million contract to develop the ODAEON optical detection system based on the MUSS 2.0 Jammer Head. It is being developed in cooperation with the BAAINBw. ODAEON automatically detects optics of enemy systems such as the surveillance optics of drones and the targeting systems of anti-tank systems. In later development steps, additional protective functions such as dazzling and jamming can be implemented.

In the future, the it is planned to combine MUSS and ODAEON technologies into a single system.
