= Challenger 3 =

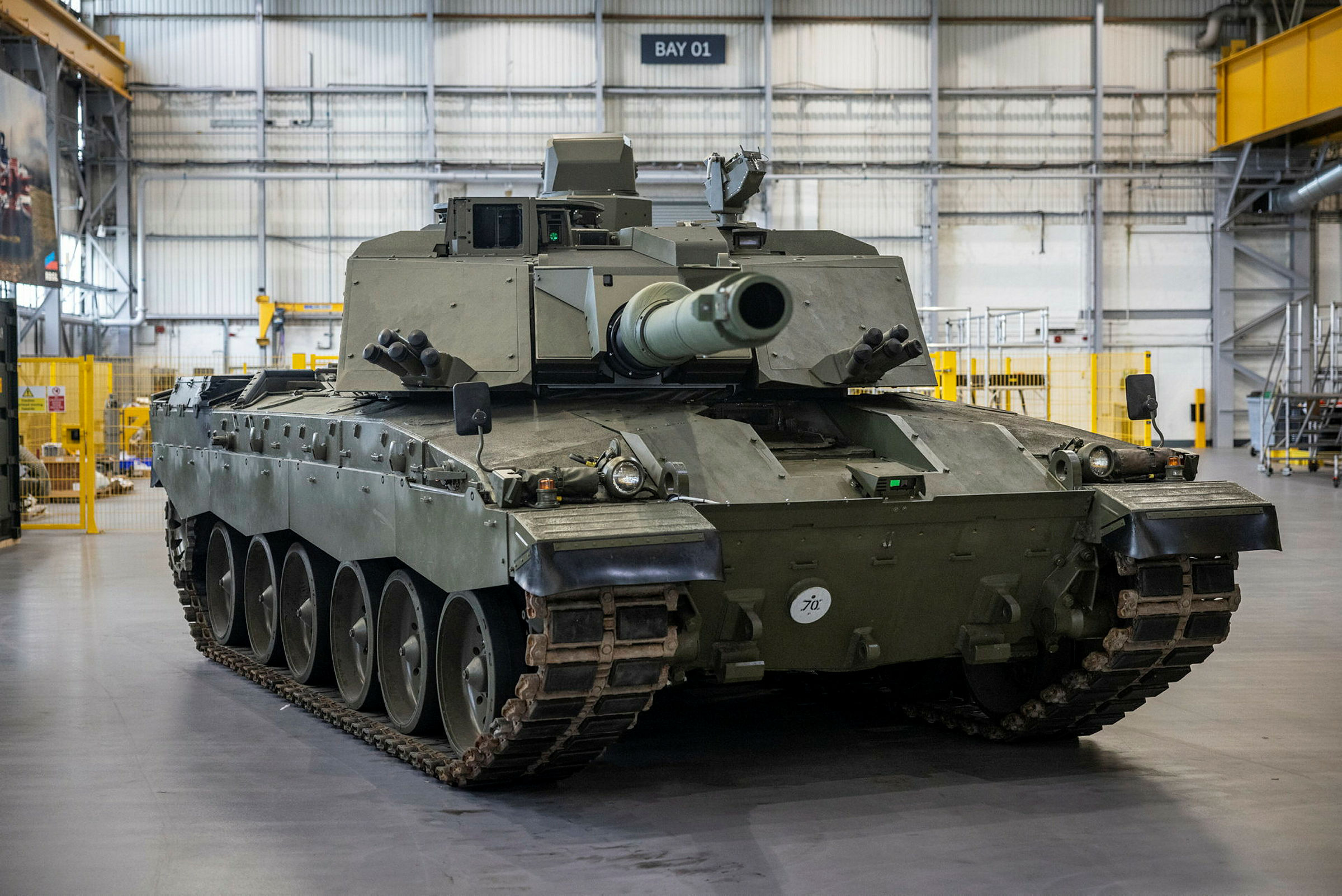
- Challenger 3 Advanced Technology Demonstrator
- Type: Main battle tank
- Place of origin: United Kingdom / Germany

Service history
- In service: From 2027
- Used by: British Army

Production history
- Designer: Rheinmetall BAE Systems Land
- Manufacturer: Rheinmetall BAE Systems Land
- Produced: 2027–2030
- No. built: 148 (Planned)

Specifications
- Mass: 66 tonnes (65 long tons; 73 short tons)
- Crew: 4 (commander, gunner, loader, driver)
- Armour: "new Modular Armour" consisting of External "EPSOM" and Internal "Farnham" Armour, APS
- Main armament: 120 mm Rheinmetall L55A1 smoothbore gun
- Engine: Perkins CV12-9A 26.1 litre V12 diesel 1,200–1,500 brake horsepower (890–1,120 kW)
- Power/weight: 22.7 hp/t (16.9 kW/t)
- Transmission: David Brown Santasalo TN54E epicyclic transmission (six forward, two reverse) with new component improvements.
- Suspension: Horstman third generation Hydrogas

Challenger 3 (CR3) is a British fourth-generation main battle tank in development for the British Army. It will be produced by the conversion of existing Challenger 2 tanks by the British/German Rheinmetall BAE Systems Land joint venture.

== Development overview ==
Improvements to Challenger 2 began in 2005 as the Capability And Sustainment Programme (CSP) to keep the Challenger 2 competitive until the 2030s. Lack of funding meant that it was not until 2014 that the programme was formally reorganised into the "Challenger 2 Life Extension Programme" (LEP). In response to the LEP programme, two prototypes were submitted for evaluation; one from BAE Systems in 2018 and the other from Rheinmetall in 2019. Later that year BAE and Rheinmetall merged their British operations into Rheinmetall BAE Systems Land (RBSL), effectively leaving Rheinmetall's proposal the only option available without replacing the Challenger 2 fleet with foreign models.

The Challenger 3 has an all-new turret and an improved hull. The most significant change from Challenger 2 to Challenger 3 is the replacement of the Challenger's main armament from a 120 mm L30A1 rifled main gun to the 120 mm L55A1 smoothbore gun (which itself is an upgraded version of the L55 fitted to the Leopard 2A6/A7 family of main battle tanks) giving commonality with other NATO members. Ammunition is to be developed in conjunction with Rheinmetall AG, with a new kinetic energy round being developed for Challenger 3 and Leopard 2.

The Challenger 3 core weight is expected to be about 66 tonnes (65 long tons; 73 short tons), but the weight of the deployable configuration is withheld for security reasons.

== Costs and service dates ==
The initial entry into service of the Challenger 3 had been brought forward to 2025, not 2027 as originally planned. A total of 148 tanks are to be produced, with core development costs estimated at £906.9 million (US$1.17 billion). By early 2024, eight pre-production tanks had been delivered and trials had commenced in Germany. In January 2024, another contract was awarded to RBSL to provide a new modular armour system for Challenger 3. The entry into service later reverted to 2027.

In 2021 whole life costs were estimated to be £1.3 billion, but by 2024 the MOD internal budgeted estimate of whole life costs had increased to £1.99 billion which now includes the modular armour system and active protection system.

== History ==
The Challenger 3 will be the fourth tank of this name, the first being the World War II Cruiser Mk VIII Challenger, which was developed from the Cromwell tank chassis and armed with a Ordnance QF 17-pounder. The second was the Gulf War-era Challenger 1, which was the British army's main battle tank (MBT) from the early 1980s to the mid-1990s, when it was succeeded by the Challenger 2 which saw action during the Iraq War in 2003.

In 2005, the MOD recognised a need for a Capability Sustainment Programme (CSP) to extend the service life of the Challenger 2 into the mid-2030s and upgrade its mobility, lethality and survivability. The CSP was planned to be complete by 2020 and was to combine all the upgrades from CLIP (Challenger Lethality Improvement Programme), including the fitting of a 120 mm smoothbore gun. By 2014, the CSP had been replaced by the Life Extension Programme (LEP) which shared a similar scope of replacing obsolete components and extending the tank's service life from 2025 to 2035, however the 120 mm smoothbore gun had seemingly been abandoned. The development project, named "Armour MBT", was formally started in December 2014.

In 2015, the British Army provided an insight into the scope of the LEP, dividing it into four key areas:

- Surveillance and target acquisition: Upgrades to the commander's primary sight and gunner's primary sight, as well as the replacement of the thermal observation and gunnery sights with third-generation thermal imaging.
- Weapon control system: Upgrades to the fire control computer, fire control panel and gun processing unit.
- Mobility: Upgrades including third-generation hydrogas suspension, improved air filtration, CV-12 common rail fuel injection, transmission and cooling.
- Electronic architecture: Upgrades to the gunner's control handles, video distribution architecture, generic vehicle architecture compliant interfaces, increased on-board processing and improved human-machine interface.

The MOD also began assessing active protection systems (APS) on the Challenger 2, including MUSS and Rheinmetall's ROSY Rapid Obscurant System.

In August 2016, the MOD awarded assessment phase contracts to several companies for the Life Extension Programme. These included Team Challenger 2 (a consortium led by BAE Systems and including General Dynamics UK), CMI Defence and Ricardo plc, Rheinmetall and Lockheed Martin UK. In November, the MOD shortlisted two teams led by BAE Systems and Rheinmetall to compete for the LEP which was then estimated to be worth £650 million (US$802 million).

In October 2018, BAE Systems unveiled its proposed Challenger 2 LEP technology demonstrator, the "Black Night". The new improvements included a Safran PASEO commander's sight, Leonardo thermal imager for the gunner and Leonardo DNVS 4 night sight. The turret also received modifications to improve the speed of traverse and to provide greater space, and regenerative braking to store energy. Other enhancements included a laser warning system and an active protection system.

In January 2019, Rheinmetall unveiled its proposal, which included the development of a completely new turret with fully digital electronic architecture, day and night sights for the commander and gunner, and a Rheinmetall L55 120 mm smoothbore gun. Whilst a more substantial upgrade than Black Night, the turret was developed on Rheinmetall's initiative and was not funded by the UK MOD, nor was it part of the MOD's LEP requirements.

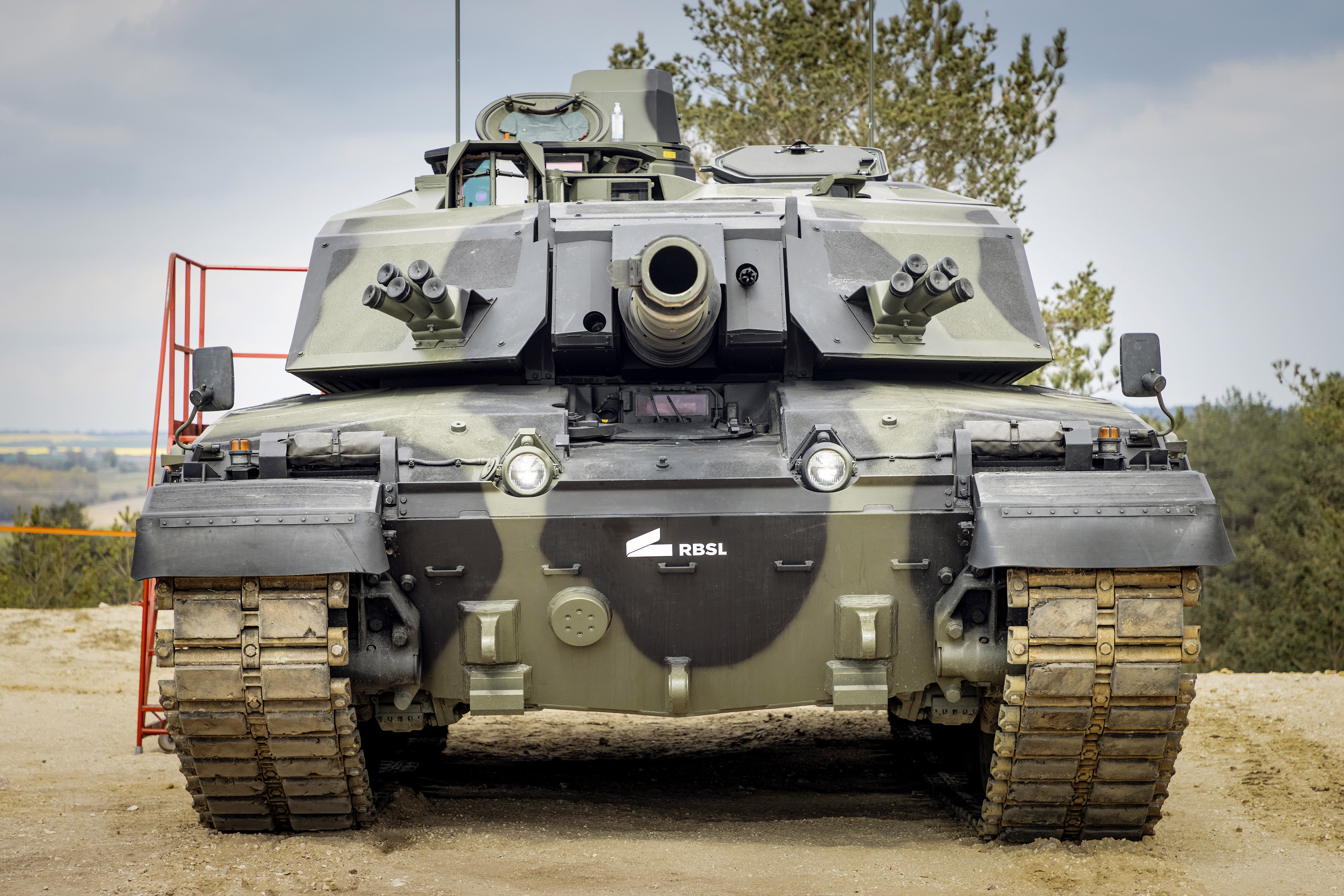
The initial Challenger 3 technology demonstrator by RBSL (2021), resembling the 2019 Challenger 2 LEP by Rheinmetall.

In June 2019, BAE Systems and Rheinmetall formed a joint venture company, based in the UK, named Rheinmetall BAE Systems Land (RBSL). Despite the merger, the company was still expected to present two separate proposals for the LEP contract. At DSEI 2019, RBSL first showed the 120mm proposal.

In July 2020, Rheinmetall Defence showed a testbed vehicle on the Challenger 2 chassis, with a brand new turret, autoloading system and a powerful 130 mm smoothbore gun, the Rheinmetall Rh-130 L/51. The 130 mm L/51 is 500 kilograms heavier than existing 120 mm L/44 or L/55 cannons and would require a larger turret for use on the Challenger 3.

In October 2020, the MOD argued against buying a new main battle tank from overseas instead of pursuing the Challenger 2 LEP, stating that an upgraded Challenger 2 would "be comparable—and in certain areas superior—to Leopard 2 or M1 Abrams".

The management of the C2 LEP was scathingly criticized by the Defence Select Committee on 15 March 2021. They said in a report entitled "Obsolescent and outgunned: the British Army's armoured vehicle capability", that "Despite having spent around 50% of the allocated budget (£800 million), the programme has yet to place a manufacturing contract. The programme has a current in-service date of 2024 (originally planned for 2017) and is some £227 million over budget. After a decade of effort, this abject failure to deliver against both cost, (with an overrun now totalling over a quarter of a billion pounds of public money) and timescale (ISD seven years late) is clearly totally unacceptable. Nevertheless, it is symptomatic of the extremely weak management of Army equipment programmes, by both Defence Equipment and Support and the Army Board itself, in recent years."

On 22 March 2021, Defence Minister Ben Wallace presented the command paper Defence in a Competitive Age to Parliament, which confirmed the British Army's plans to upgrade 148 Challenger 2 tanks for "around £1.3bn" and designate them Challenger 3. The MOD confirmed the contract with RBSL had been signed, valued at £800 million (US$1 billion), on 7 May 2021. Rheinmetall's more extensive upgrade proposal, including the new 120 mm smoothbore gun, had been accepted. The initial operating capability for the upgraded tanks is expected by 2027, with trials commencing Q2 2025, with full operation capability expected to be declared by 2030.

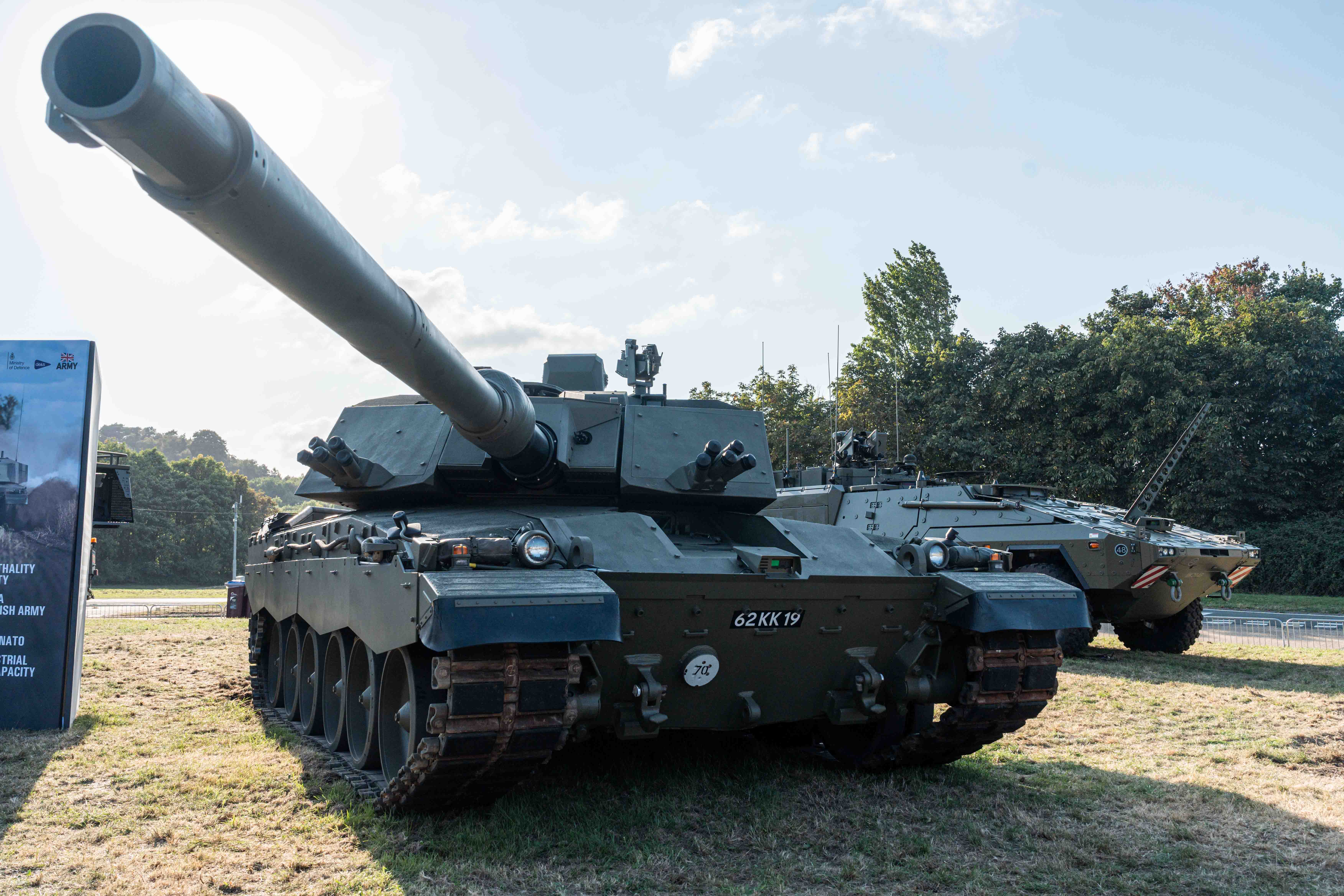
A pre-production Challenger 3 on display at DVD2024, a defence equipment exhibition at the Millbrook Proving Ground, in September 2024

On 3 May 2022, the stabilisation system of the gun was contracted to Curtiss-Wright Drive Technology in Switzerland.

It was announced on 23 January 2024 that the first pre-production Challenger 3 had been delivered, with trials commencing in Germany in February and the first live-firing of the main armament in April. On 18 April 2024, the Defence Secretary, Grant Shapps, attended the rollout of the last of eight pre-production models at the RBSL factory in Telford. A Ministry of Defence statement claimed that nearly 300 jobs would be created at the RBSL plant, with a further 450 jobs around the UK in a supply chain of companies based in the West Midlands, Glasgow, Newcastle upon Tyne and the Isle of Wight. In response to a parliamentary question in May 2025, Maria Eagle, the Minister of State for Defence Procurement and Industry, stated that "additional resources have been directed towards ensuring the materials required for Challenger 3 main battle tanks are available to meet the delivery timescales", following concerns about delays in the supply chain for the programme.

On 27 April 2024, the Ministry of Defence announced that a statement of intent had been signed with Germany for the development of an Enhanced Kinetic Energy (EKE) armour-piercing round for both Challenger 3 and Leopard 2 tanks.

In September 2025, RBSL announced that Challenger 3 had completed mobility testing, covering nearly 800 km over various types of terrain in several locations across the United Kingdom. These trials are to be followed by crewed live-firing tests, as previous testing had been unmanned. Following that, a System Qualification Review (SQR) will set the manufacturing standards for the production vehicles.

In June 2026, The Telegraph reported that the Challenger 3 upgrade programme had been delayed due to engineering constraints on the turret due to increased weight. Later that month, the Challenger 3 made its first public debut at TankFest 2026, making an unannounced appearance alongside its predecessors, the Challenger 1 and Challenger 2.

As of September 2026 seven prototype vehicles had been delivered for the Demonstration Phase trails programme, with an eighth vehicle almost completed.

== See also ==
- List of main battle tanks by generation
