= Pansarbandvagn 302 =

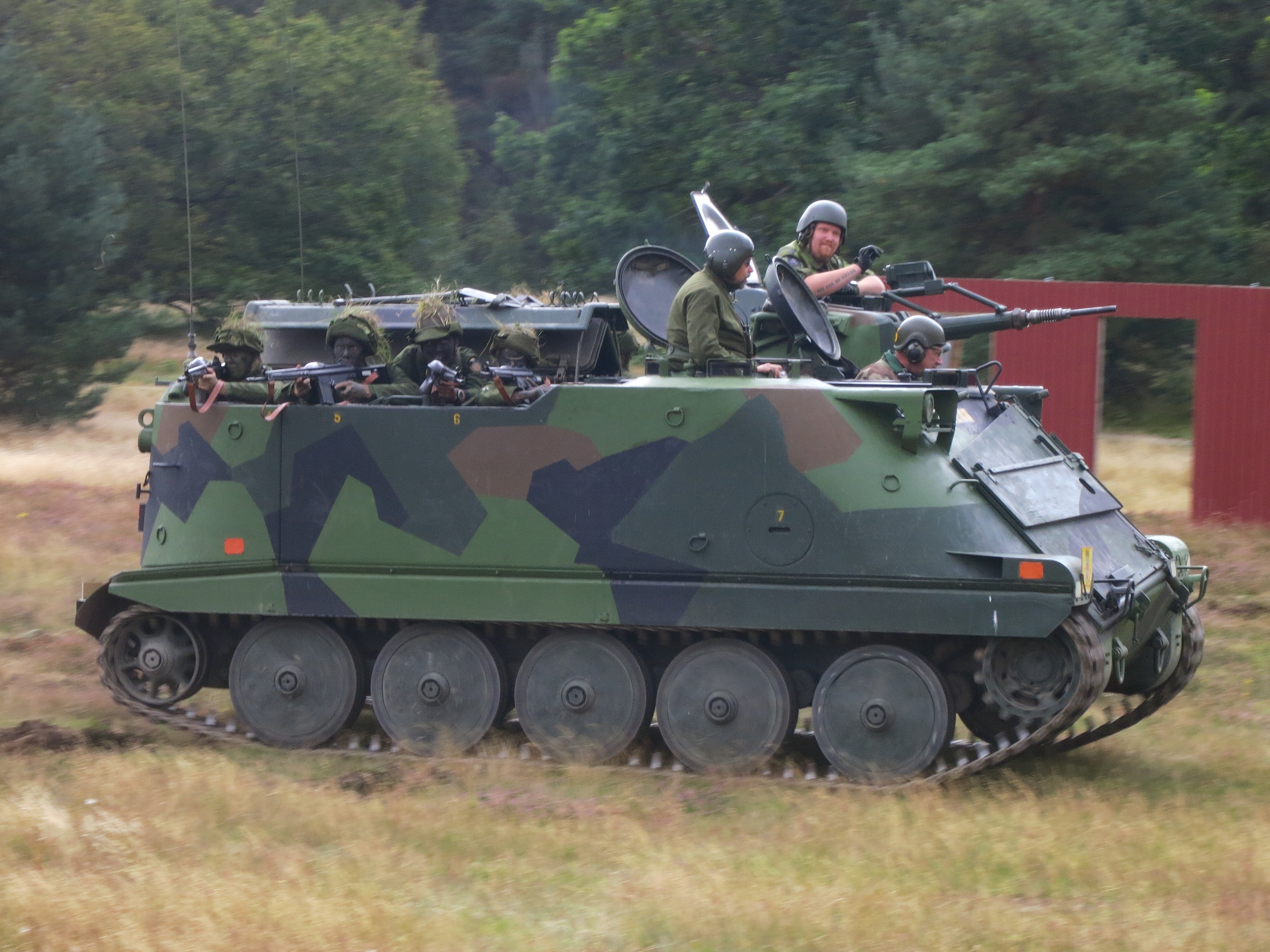
- A Pbv 302 at a combat exhibition
- Type: Infantry fighting vehicle
- Place of origin: Sweden

Service history
- Wars: Russo-Ukrainian War

Production history
- Designed: 1961–1966
- Produced: 1966–1971
- No. built: 644 all variants

Specifications
- Mass: 14 tonnes (31,000 lb)
- Length: 5.35 metres (17.6 ft)
- Width: 2.86 metres (9.4 ft)
- Height: 2.50 metres (8.2 ft)
- Crew: 3 (commander, driver, gunner) + 8 (passengers)
- Armor: 23 millimetres (0.91 in)
- Main armament: 20 mm automatkanon m/47D
- Secondary armament: 2 × 71mm Lyran mortars
- Engine: Diesel, Volvo THD 100; 270 hp (201 kW)
- Power/weight: 19.29 hp/tonne
- Suspension: Torsion beam suspension
- Operational range: 300 kilometres (190 mi)
- Maximum speed: 66 kilometres per hour (41 mph)

Pansarbandvagn 302 (pbv 302), meaning roughly armoured tracked carrier vehicle 302, (Note: Pansarbandvagn directly translates to "armor track wagon". The term bandvagn, even though it translates to track wagon, is a Swedish military term used to describe tracked multipurpose carrier type vehicles. Tracked vehicles designed for more specialized combat roles, like tanks etc (Swedish: stridsvagn), are instead only called wagons (chassis description) to denote that they are tracked but more specialized and less universal.) is a Swedish high-mobility infantry fighting vehicle (Swedish: pansarskyttefordon) used by the Swedish Army from 1966 to 2014.

The vehicle was commissioned by the Swedish Army in 1961 as a modern IFV-design which could replace the recently developed pbv 301 IFV, a placeholder design based on an obsolete tank chassis which did not meet the Swedish Army's future operational requirements. Design and production was handled by Hägglund & Söner in Örnsköldsvik, whose military vehicle business is now BAE Systems Hägglunds. Production ran from 1966 to 1971, and the vehicles were upgraded and renovated multiple times throughout their service life. The design was eventually replaced by the strf 9040 IFV in the 1990s, and saw limited service alongside it until ultimately being removed from service in 2014.

In 2024 Sweden donated its entire stock of around 200 Pbv 302 to Ukraine, where it has seen combat in the Russo-Ukrainian War, defending against the Russian invasion of Ukraine.

Armament is a modified 20 mm Hispano HS-804 cannon (Swedish: 20 mm akan m/47D) in a one man turret, and internal racks for weapons of the mechanized infantry (Swedish: pansarskytte), such as their service weapons, a ksp 58 squad machine gun and a Carl Gustaf 8.4 cm recoilless rifle, along with ammunition. Later variants were updated with racks for AT4s and some vehicles even received a Bofors BILL man-portable anti-tank missile system. As part of the Swedish IFV-doctrine the vehicle came equipped with roof doors, allowing the mechanized infantry to fight from within the vehicles.

== Description ==
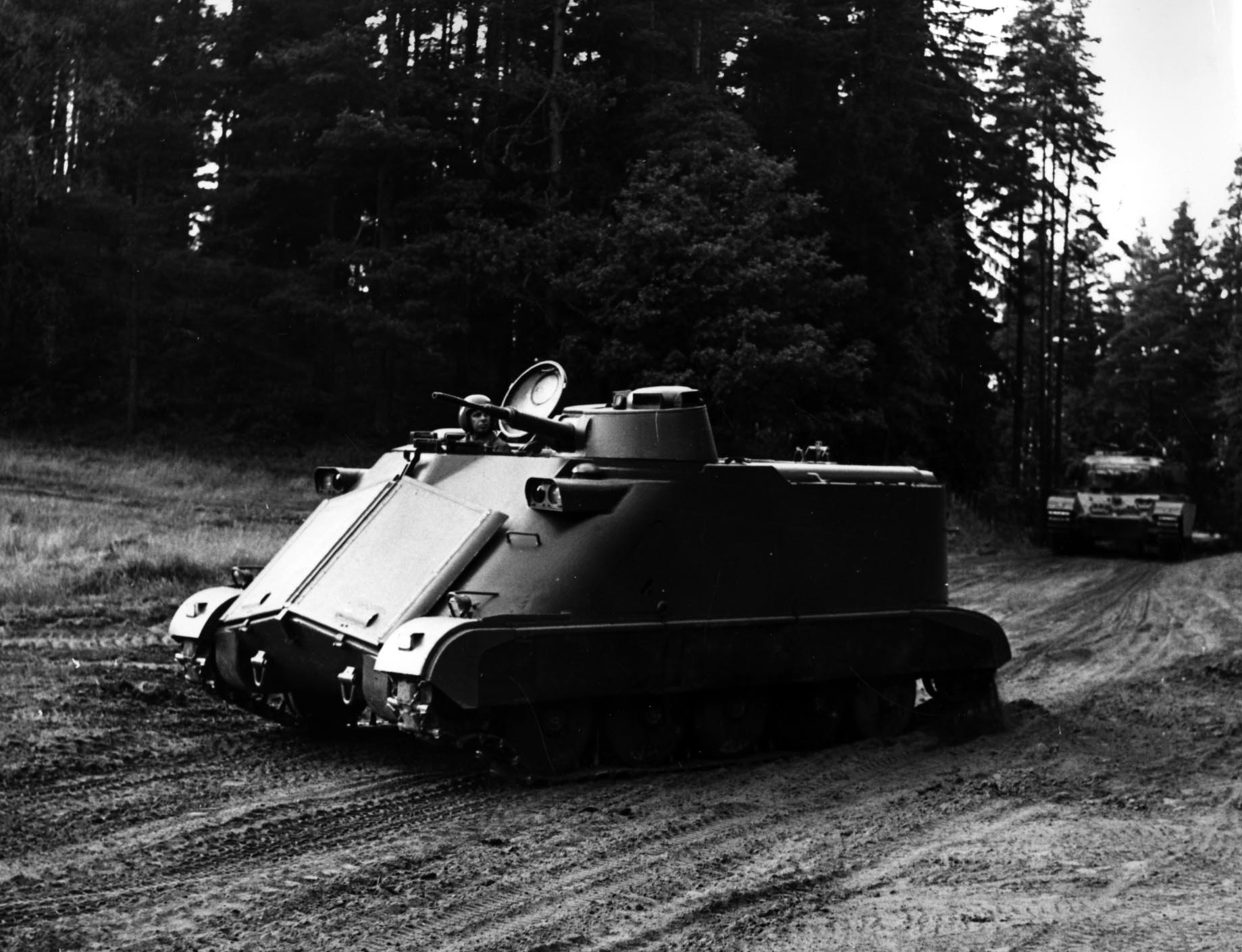
An early variant of the Pansarbandvagn 302.

The Pbv 302 has wide tracks and a high power-to-weight ratio. It has exceptionally good off-road mobility, and the low ground pressure enables it to operate over summer bog and winter snow. It is powered by a Volvo 10-liter, 270 hp diesel engine. The vehicle is fully amphibious with little preparation by the crew. It is fitted with a 20 mm Hispano-Suiza type 804 cannon taken from the scrapped Saab 29, in a one-man turret.

High-explosive cartridges were originally fed from 135-round belts. Armor-piercing cartridges were fed from a 10-round magazine. Three belts and 10 magazines were carried inside the vehicle. The arrangement was deemed overly complicated and was replaced by 30-round magazines, 10 of which were carried. The vehicle weighs 14 tonnes. It has a crew of three, a commander, driver and a gunner, and carries a squad of eight troops.

The infantry squad is able to fight through two large roof hatches. Standard procedure would be to dismount through the two side-hinged doors in the rear to fight. Maximum road speed is 65 km/h, restricted for peace time use. The fuel range on roads is about 300 km.

The Pbv 302 shares common components with the Ikv 91 infantry support light tank. Total production was 644 units.

=== Versions and variants ===
- Pansarbandvagn 302A: The original standard troop transport/IFV version. Its designation translates literally into armoured tracked vehicle.
- Pansarbandvagn 302B: Upgraded with spalling liner and external armour.
- Pansarbandvagn 302C: As Pbv 302B, with reinforced suspension, new lights, flare-launcher, new turbo and air condition. It has mainly been used for UN and KFOR missions.

Variants available in several versions, noted with the appropriate letter (i.e. Epbv 3022C)

- Stridsledningspansarbandvagn (Stripbv) 3021: The C3I command post for battalion and brigade commanders and other staff members. Designation means battle command vehicle.
- Eldledningspansarbandvagn (Epbv) 3022: Forward observer vehicle for artillery observers fire control personnel. Designation means fire directing vehicle.
- Batteriplatspansarbandvagn (Bplpbv) 3023: The battery command control vehicle attached to Bandkanon 1 batteries. Designation means (artillery) battery command vehicle.
- Radiolänkpansarbandvagn (Rlpbv) 3024: Communications vehicle for directed radio communications. Designation means radio relay vehicle.
- Pjäsrekognoseringspansarbandvagn (Pjrekpbv) 3025: Battery reconnaissance vehicle. Designation means cannon reconnaissance vehicle.
- Sjuktransportpansarbandvagn (Sjuktppbv) 3026: Unarmed medical evacuation vehicle. Designation means casualty transport vehicle.

Two more vehicles were developed using the Pbv 302 chassis.

- Bärgningsbandvagn (Bgbv) 82: An armoured recovery vehicle. Designation means recovery vehicle.
- Brobandvagn (Brobv) 941: A bridgelayer. Designation means Bridge vehicle.

== Operators ==
=== Current operators ===
Ukraine

- On 31 October 2024 Ukrainian media reported that Ukrainian Ground Forces had received Pbv 302s from Sweden, which in May 2024 had pledged to donate its entire stock of around 200 Pbv 302 to Ukraine. As 14 April 2026, 37 Pbv 302 have been visually reported lost by the Oryxblog.

=== Former operators ===
Sweden

- All built used by the Swedish armed forces until 2014, when it was replaced by the stridsfordon 9040.

== See also ==
Comparable vehicles of similar design

- Tgb m/42 KP – (Sweden)
- Pbv 301 – (Sweden)
- FV432 – (United Kingdom)
- M113 armored personnel carrier – (United States)
- Type 63 (armoured personnel carrier) – (China)
