= Landsverk L-120 =

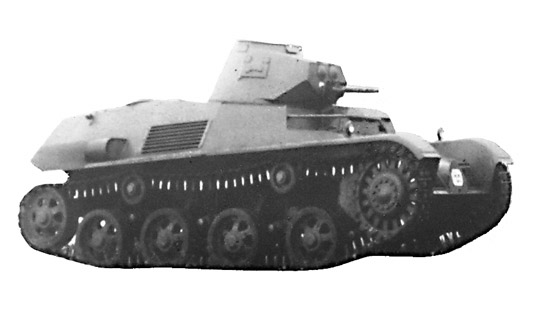
- Type: Light tank
- Place of origin: Sweden

Service history
- In service: 1937–1940
- Used by: Sweden (testing purposes); Norway

Production history
- Manufacturer: AB Landsverk
- Unit cost: SEK 30,000 (tank chassis)
- Produced: 1936–1938
- No. built: 1 tank + 1 or 2 tank chassis

Specifications
- Mass: 4 - 4.5 tons
- Length: 4.05 m (13 ft 3 in)
- Width: 1.75 m (5 ft 9 in)
- Height: 1.65 m (5 ft 5 in)
- Crew: 2 (Commander/gunner and driver)
- Armour: Steel armour (Sweden); Iron plating (Norway)
- Main armament: Norway: 7.92 mm Colt M/29 heavy machine gun
- Transmission: 4-speed Volvo gear box
- Maximum speed: 25 kilometres per hour (16 mph)
- Steering system: Levers (Sweden); Steering wheel (Norway)

Landsverk L-120 was a light tank designed in Sweden. One tank and one tank chassis was ordered for tests by the Swedish Army in 1936, and one chassis was ordered by the Norwegian Army the same year. The chassis sold to Norway became Norway's first ever tank, after an improvised turret and makeshift armour had been added.

== Swedish service ==
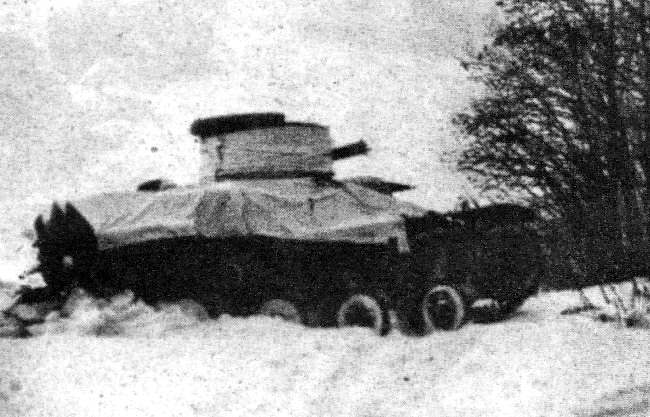
"Rikstanken" taking part in military winter exercises in Norway

In October 1936 the Swedish Army placed an order with the armoured fighting vehicle manufacturer AB Landsverk in the Scanian city of Landskrona for one L-120 tank and one L-120 tank chassis for testing purposes. In April the following year an order for a tank turret followed. The tank chassis was delivered to the Swedish Army in May 1937, and the tank in July–August the same year. In July 1937, just some two months after it was delivered, the tank chassis was bought back by AB Landsverk in connection with a large order for Landsverk L-60 light tanks being made by the Swedish government from AB Landsverk. The repurchased tank chassis was then probably used to fulfil an order from Norway.

== "Rikstanken" ==
Concurrently with the Swedish order Landsverk also received an order from Norway for a tank chassis, delivery was set in March 1937. The cost of the purchase was SEK 30,000, around the equivalent of US$3,000. After delivery delays the tank chassis was handed over to Norway. The chassis was equipped after arrival with an improvised turret and ordinary iron plates for armour and was armed with a Colt M/29 heavy machine gun, making it Norway's first ever tank. The tank was quickly dubbed "Rikstanken" (English: The National Tank) by the Norwegians. Other nicknames were "Kongstanken" (English: The Royal Tank) and "Norgestanken" (English: The Norway Tank). The name "Norgestanken" was a humorous invention, playing on the fact that the word tanken in Norwegian means both "the tank" and "the thought", making it a pun. The noun "Norgestanken" (English: the Norway thought) was an old nationalistic term for the idea of an independent Norway. Kongstanken, as in "the royal thought", signifies a grand and bold thought or an idealistic idea.

"The field exercise at Jæren in 1938 was a horror of primitive matériel. There was next to nothing of signals, communications and sapper matériel, nor were there any motorized units, except the only terror of the exercise, the old tank that shook, functioned and failed, all on its own discretion... A depressing lack of matériel compared to a wonderful human material. "

—Eyewitness Rob. Jo. (Robert Johnsen) from Stavanger.

The purchase of the tank by the Norwegian government happened on the background of the increased tension in Europe preceding the Second World War. The threatening situation convinced the Norwegian government to budget 20,000 kr for the purchase of a tank for the Norwegian Army. As the shipping costs of the complete tank would be too expensive, only the chassis was imported. As adding the original steel armour would cost another NOK 50,000, iron plates were used instead. In addition, the steering levers were replaced with a steering wheel. The engine of the tank proved unreliable and at best gave a top speed of 25 kilometres per hour (16 mph). The brakes were also found to be too weak, with the tank once ending up crashed against a tree during a field exercise in Trøndelag.

Together with an experimental platoon of locally manufactured armoured cars Rikstanken formed the Norwegian cavalry's armoured force. Rikstanken and the three armoured cars took part in all the Norwegian Army's exercises in 1938 and 1939. The armoured vehicles moved around to the different dragoon regiments of the Norwegian Army.

In the January 1938 lecture "Panservogner for opklaring og marsjsikring i Norge" (Armoured vehicles for reconnaissance and protection during the march in Norway) at the officers' society Oslo Militære Samfund, Colonel Christopher Fougner pointed out that the single tank in the Norwegian armoury was completely insufficient to train the country's soldiers in anti-armour warfare. Colonel Fougner warned that if more tanks and other armoured vehicles were not expressly acquired, then the first tank most Norwegian soldiers would see would belong to an attacking enemy army.

On 9 April 1940, when the Germans invaded Norway, the tank and the three armoured cars were stored in the depot of Dragoon Regiment 1 at Gardermoen. When Dragoon Regiment 1 finished its mobilization at 03:00 on 10 April and moved out to oppose the invading German forces they left both the tank and the armoured cars behind. The tank and the armoured cars were captured by the advancing Germans and disappeared from records, after having been a popular object for souvenir photos for German troops at Gardermoen in May 1940.

== Variants ==
Pvlvv fm/42 - Swedish attempt at making a self propelled anti-tank/aircraft vehicle using the m/40 automatic cannon.

== References and notes ==
References

== Bibliography ==
- Broch, Ole Jacob (1950). Oslo militære samfund gjennom 25 år: 1925-50 (in Norwegian). Oslo: Norsk militært tidsskrift.
- Jensen, Åke F. (1995). Kavaleriet i Norge 1200-1994: Utvikling og innsats gjennom 800 år (in Norwegian). Oslo: Elanders forlag. ISBN 82-90545-43-6.
- Kristiansen, Tom (2008). Tysk trussel mot Norge? Forsvarsledelse, trusselvurderinger og militære tiltak før 1940 (in Norwegian). Bergen: Fagbokforlaget. ISBN 978-82-450-0674-2.
- Mølmen, Øystein (1998). Raumabanen/Romsdalen, Lesja og Dovre: kamphandlingene i april 1940 (in Norwegian). Raumabanens kulturlag. ISBN 82-994722-0-2.
- Wig, Kjell Arnljot (1977). Kongen ser tilbake (in Norwegian). Oslo: J. W. Cappelens Forlag. ISBN 82-02-03914-2.
