= Terrängbil m/42 KP =

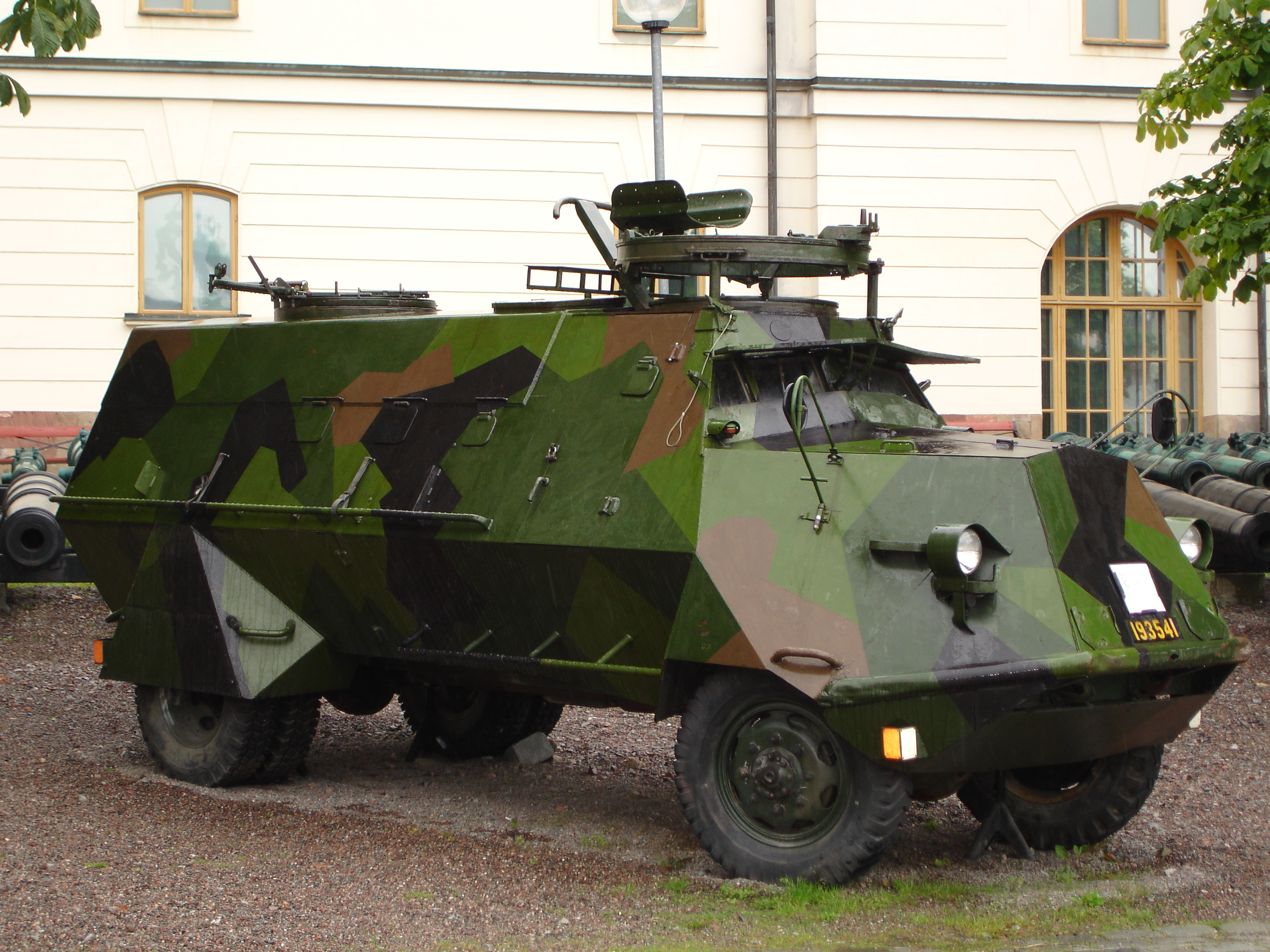
- The final terrängbil m/42 KP model: tgb m/42 E SKPF, at the Swedish Army Museum in Stockholm.
- Type: Infantry fighting vehicle
- Place of origin: Sweden

Service history
- In service: 1944–1970: Volvo KP; 1944–2004: Scania KP
- Wars: Congo Crisis

Production history
No. built
Scania: 300	Volvo: 200
- Variants: See variants

Specifications
Mass
Scania (SKPF); 6.3 t (14,000 lb)	Volvo (VKPF); 6.96 t (15,300 lb)
Length
6.9 m (22 ft 8 in)	6.85 m (22 ft 6 in)
Width
2.3 m (7 ft 7 in)	2.33 m (7 ft 8 in)
Height
2.9 m (9 ft 6 in)	2.8 m (9 ft 2 in)
- Crew: 3: commander, driver, gunner
- Passengers: 16: fully equipped soldiers
- Armor: 8 to 20 mm (0.31 in to 0.79 in)
- Main armament: Initially unarmed 1 × single 8 mm ksp m/39 (1940s); 1 × twin 8 mm ksp m/36 lv dbl (1956); 2 × single 7.62 mm ksp 58B (1983); 1 × single 12.7 mm DShKM (Baltic states)
- Secondary armament: 6 × smoke grenade discharger (1983)
Engine
Scania-Vabis type 402/1; 4-cylinder petrol/motyl	Volvo type FET; 6-cylinder petrol
115 hp (84.6 kW) at 2300 rpm	105 hp (77.2 kW) at 2500 rpm
Payload capacity
1.8 t (4,000 lb)	1.54 t (3,400 lb)
Drive
4 wheel drive (selectable)	4 wheel drive (selectable)
Transmission
4+1 gears	4+1 gears (D-8)
- Fuel capacity: 110 L (29 US gal)
Operational
range
300 km (190 mi)	300 km (190 mi)
Maximum speed
70 km/h (43 mph) (road); 35 km/h (22 mph) (off-road)	70 km/h (43 mph) (road); 35 km/h (22 mph) (off-road)

Terrängbil m/42 Karosseri Pansar (tgb m/42 KP; (Note: The name is formally "descriptive" and thus not "capitalized" within a sentence.) "terrain car, model 1942, coachwork armour"), colloquially known as "KP-cars" (Swedish: KP-bilar), was an early Swedish infantry fighting vehicle developed during World War II. At its core, it is a flatbed truck with 4 wheel drive for off-road driving, fitted with an armoured body elongated over and around the bed, with a troop transport compartment behind the cabin for a armor infantry squad of 16.

Two base variants existed based on the chassis: a Scania-chassis-based variant, designated the "tgb m/42 SKP" (Scania KP), and a Volvo-chassis-based variant, designated the "tgb m/42 VKP" (Volvo KP).

The tgb m/42 KP was replaced by the tracked pbv 301 as the main infantry fighting vehicle of the Swedish Army.

== Classification ==
Due to the wheeled chassis and machine gun armament, the tgb m/42 KP is often called an armoured personnel carrier (APC), via comparison to common such, like the BTR-152, BTR-80, Patria Pasi, Patria AMV, etc. This is terminologically incorrect, as vehicles are not classed by appearance, but by doctrine.

The vehicle was purpose built as a first generation infantry fighting vehicle, intended to carry a designated IFV-squad (Swedish: pansarskytte, "armor infantry") as a protected firing position, in, during, and out of battle, so called mounted combat, with the ability to off-load troops depending on the situation, so called dismounted combat — see the Panzergrenadier-article for more information on this doctrine.

While fixed armament consisted of rifle-caliber weapons, the infantry compartment featured storage for anti-tank and support weapons, including ammunition for the squad.

== History ==
=== Development ===
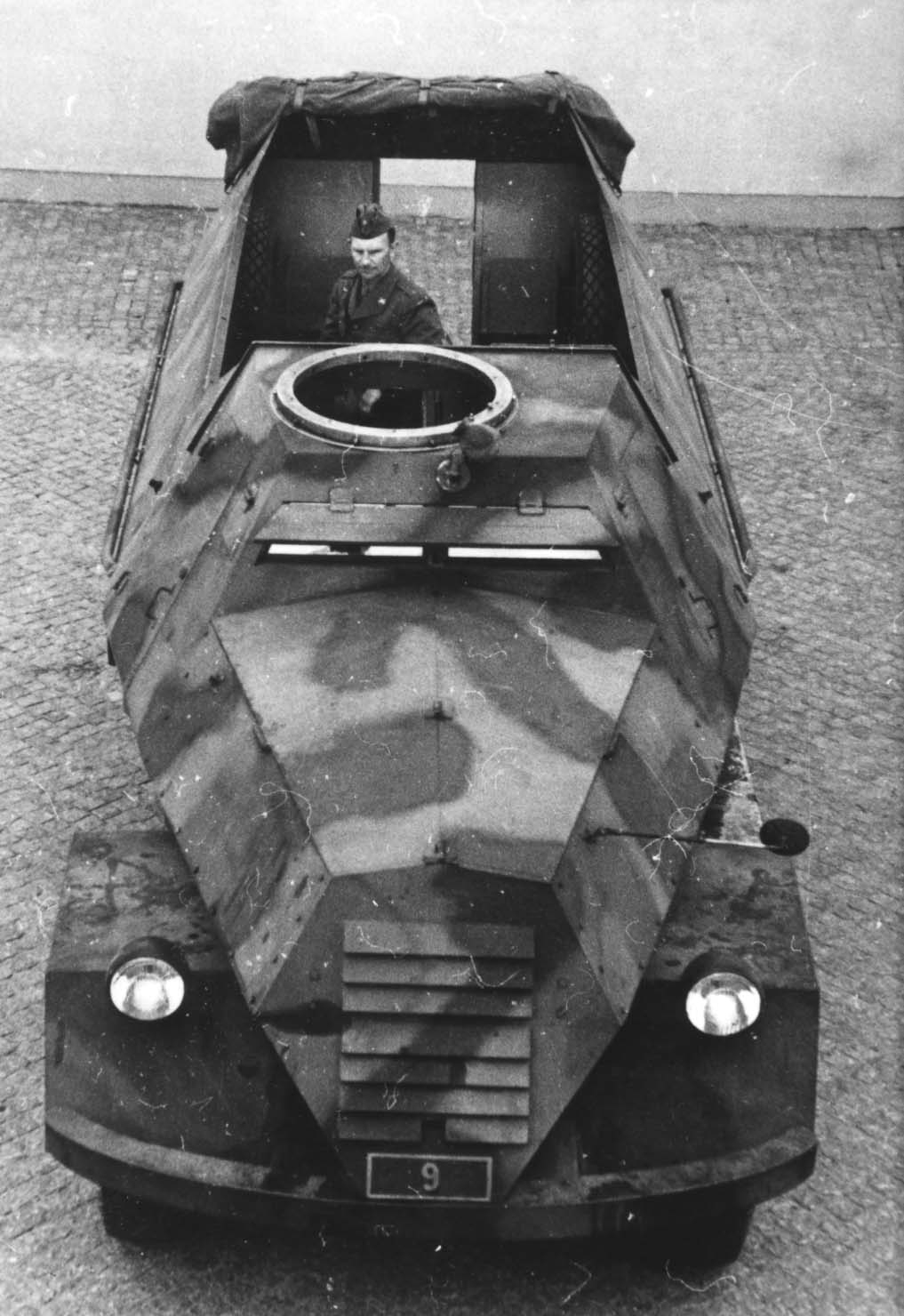
A Tgb m/42 KP prototype. Note the different front, off-set cabin roof hole and the troop door at the back.

In 1941, when tanks were organised into a unit of their own, it was clear there was a desperate need for a troop carrier able to both keep up with the tanks and provide protection against artillery shrapnel and small-arms fire. Due to the war, there were no international suppliers to buy from, so the only option was to develop a domestic solution. AB Landsverk designed an IFV consisting of a chassis from a regular army lorry equipped with an armoured coachwork. The prototype had many similarities to the German Sd.Kfz. 251 IFV, featuring a similarly shaped cabin front and a troop door at the back. The cabin front was altered and the back door removed on the service models.

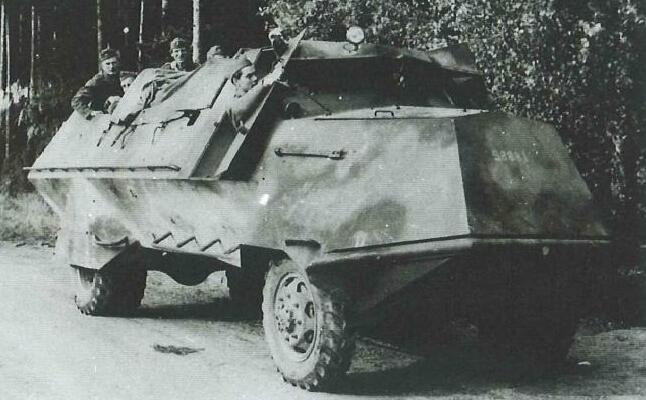
An early terrängbil m/42 KP 1943.

After prototyping, production was set up based on two types of truck chassis, a Volvo chassis and a Scania-Vabis chassis. The armour-plates were made by Bofors, Landsverk, Bröderna Hedlund and Karlstads Mekaniska Werkstad and then delivered to Volvo or Scania-Vabis for final assembly on their chassis'. The Volvo versions, Tgb m/42 VKP had a fixed winch on the right side for towing the vehicle forward. The Scania-Vabis, SKP, had a windlass on the left side, which allowed towing both forwards and backwards.

=== Service ===
The first approved delivery was made in 1944, after some 38 vehicles had been failed due to tensions caused by welding the hardened steel. This was rectified by switching to soft-hardened steel and then heating the completed body-work in purpose-built ovens to remove tension.

During the 1950s the vehicles were modified with a ring-mounting for a double machine gun on the cab roof, and the designations changed to Tgb m/42 VKPF and SKPF (F = Fordonsluftvärn, or vehicular anti-aircraft).

In 1983, many surviving SKPFs of the Swedish Army were modified with armoured roofs and in many other ways, resulting in several new versions.

=== International use ===
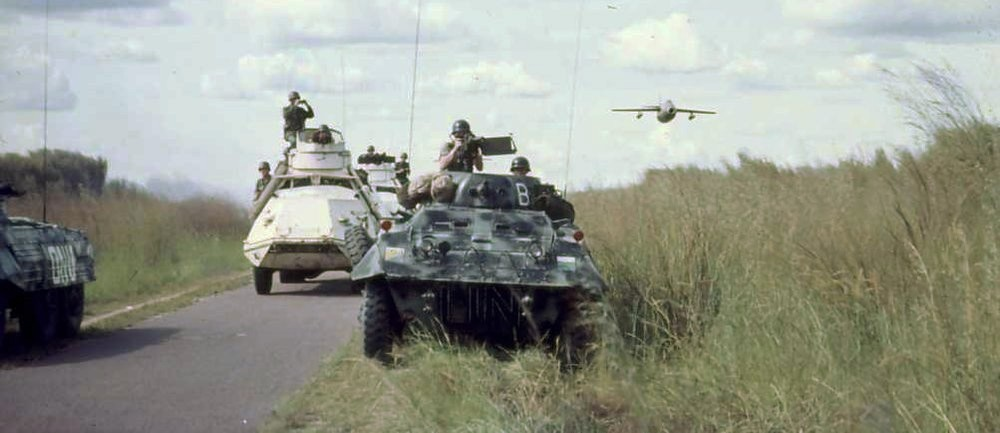
Two terrängbil m/42 SKPF advancing upon Kaminaville, with two Swedish Pansarbil M8 during the Congo Crisis. In the background, a J 29B strike fighter.

The SKPF saw combat with Swedish UN forces during the Congo Crisis in the 1961–1964 period, while the VKPF was kept for domestic use. 15 SKPFs were also bought by the UN and used by the Indian and Irish battalions in Congo. After a number of KP gunners in Congo were shot in the waist, armour plating to cover the gap between the roof and the machine gun ring was added in sito.

A few left-behind UN SKPFs were reconditioned and used by the Congolese Army in 1964–65.

SKPFs were deployed by United Nations Peacekeeping Force in Cyprus during the intercommunal violence in 1964, some being donated to the UN forces there.

In 1993, Estonia, Latvia and Lithuania were rebuilding their militaries, and Sweden donated 10 SKPF to each, some modified to mount a 12.7 mm DShKM heavy machine gun over the cabin. They were retired by the early 2000s and eventually moved to museums.

== Technical description ==
=== Body ===
The armoured body featured 8 to 20 mm (0.31 in to 0.79 in) thick welded sloped armour all around, making it effectively bullet proof. For disembarking and boarding, the troop compartment had an armored hatch on each lower side of the vehicle, right in front of the rear axle wheels.

The troop compartment originally lacked a fixed roof and had partially open sides meant for the infantry to shoot from as part of its infantry fighting vehicle role. Instead of a fixed roof, the back end of the body had full height sides so a tarpaulin could be fitted over the troop compartment between the cabin and the back. In 1983, most remaining vehicles were updated with a new fully enclosed troop compartment with firing ports and a back door for fast disembarkment.

=== Armament ===
While always intended for fixed armament, featuring a round hatch sized hole on the cabin roof, the vehicles initially lacked any permanent weapons, and the cabin roof hole was often bolted over with a metal plate. Instead the vehicles were outfitted with storage for the weaponry, munition and equipment of the pansarskytte, such as machine guns, hand grenades and man-portable anti-tank systems. An early vehicle trialed using a 20 mm akan m/40 autocannon. The first standard fixed armament was a single ksp m/39 machine gun, fitted in a rotating turret ring on top of the cabin, sometime in the late 1940s. This machine gun could fire the 8×63mm m/32 machine gun cartridge or the 6.5×55mm m/94 rifle cartridge, depending on the barrel fitted.

In 1956, the existing vehicles received new armament in the form of twin ksp m/36 lv dbl (luftvärn dubbel) anti-aircraft machine guns in a rotating ring-mount on the cabin roof. These could also fire the 8 mm m/32 and 6.5 mm m/94 rounds depending on the barrel. Post 1972, they could fire the 7.62×51mm NATO cartridge. During the 1983 REMO-upgrade, the ksp m/36 twin-mount was replaced with two 7.62 mm ksp m/58B light machine guns in single mounts, one on the cabin roof and one at the back of the new troop compartment roof. The new enclosed compartment featured three portholes on each side of the vehicle for use as firing ports with assault rifles.

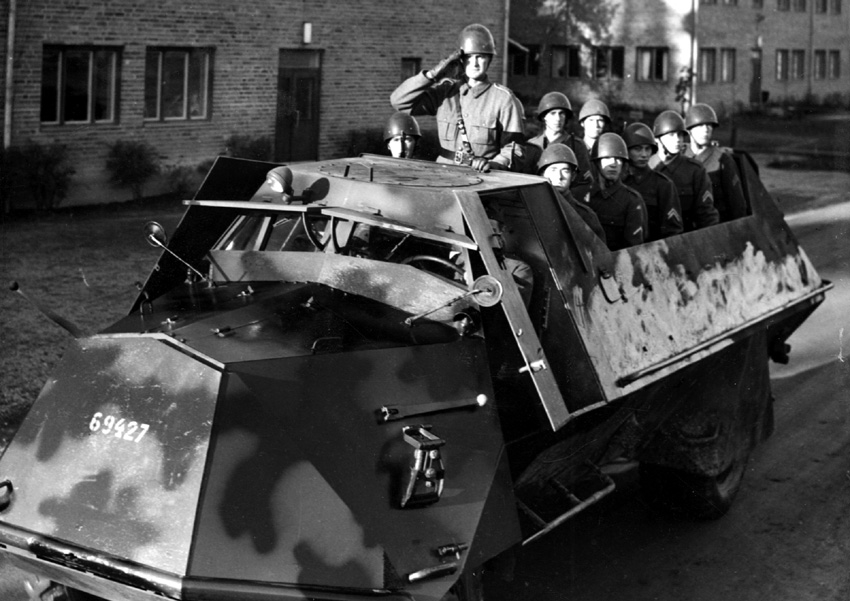
A Tgb m/42 KP in an early 1940s configuration, with the cabin roof hole bolted over.

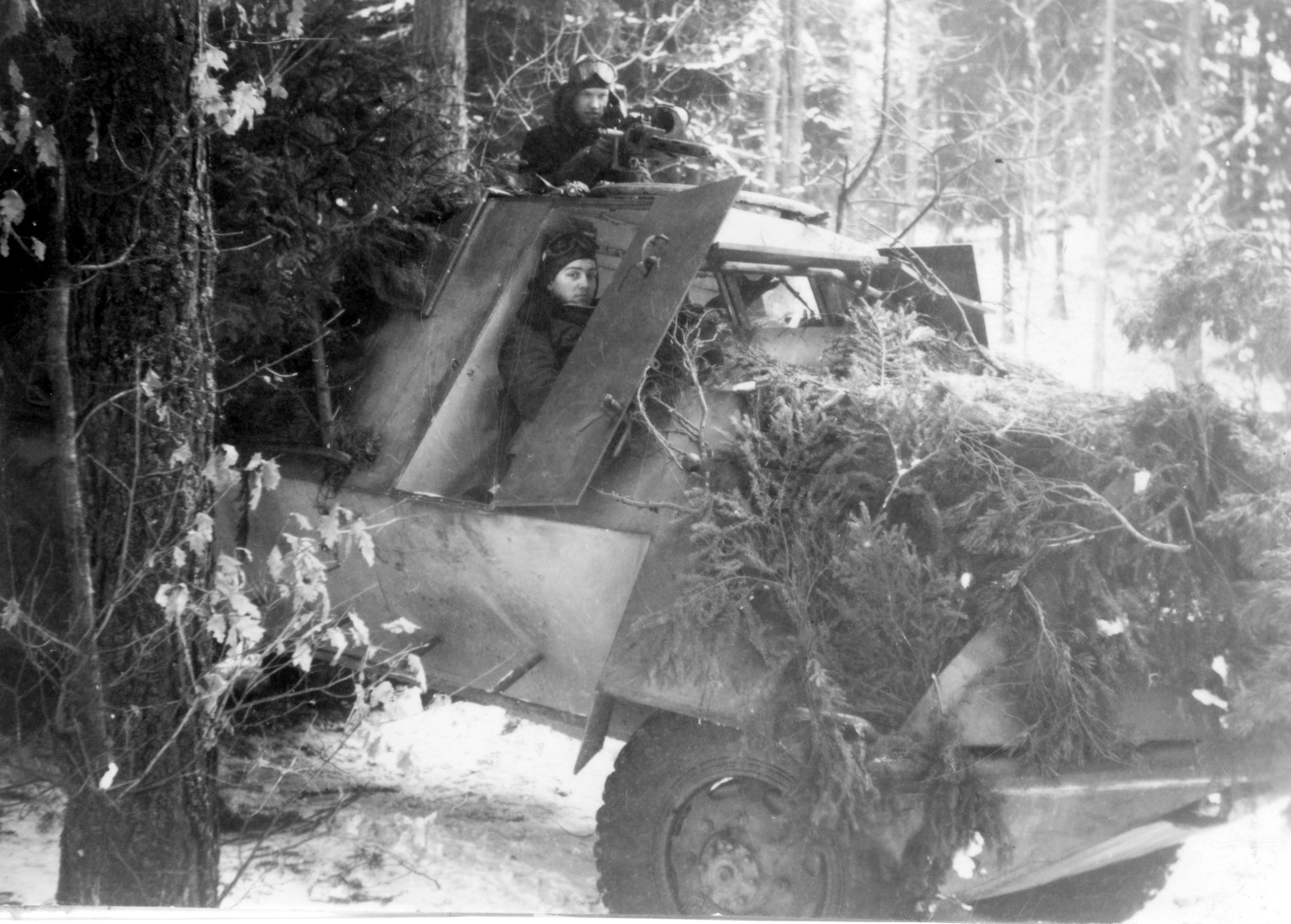
Tgb m/42 KP in later 1940s configuration, armed with a single ksp m/39 machine gun on the roof, 1948.

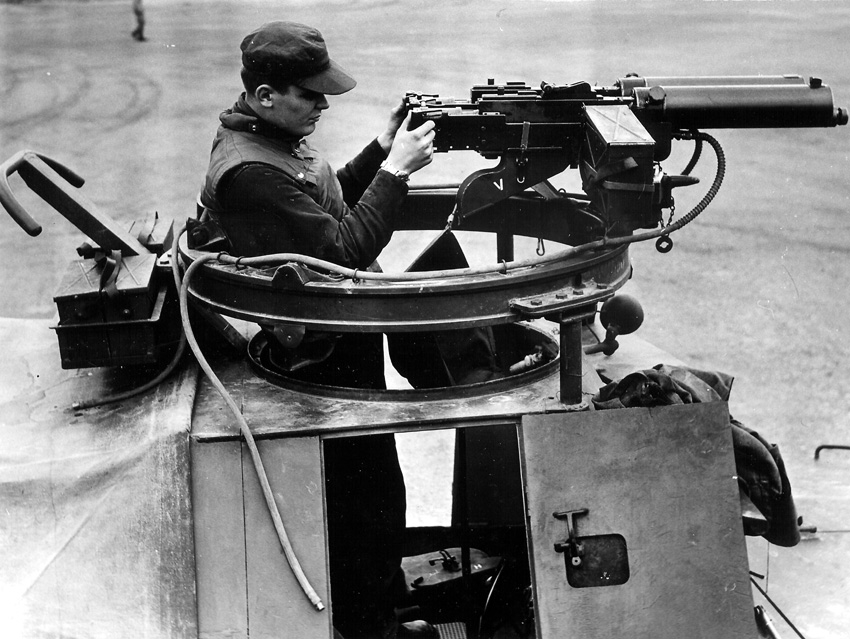
Tgb m/42 KP in 1956 KPF configuration, armed with twin ksp m/36 lv dbl machine guns.

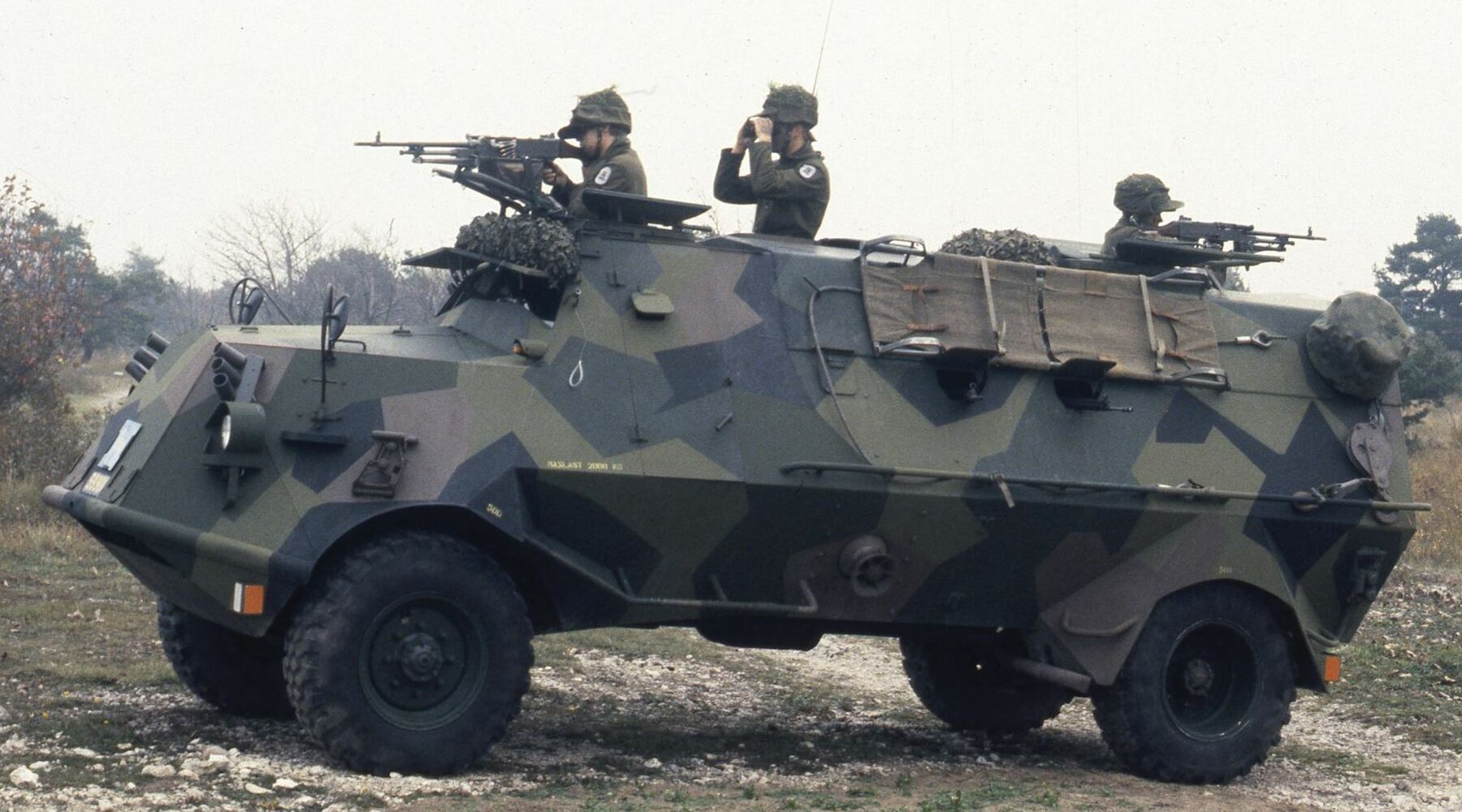
Tgb m/42 D SKPF (1983 REMO configuration), armed with two single ksp m/58B machine guns on the roof.

== Variants ==
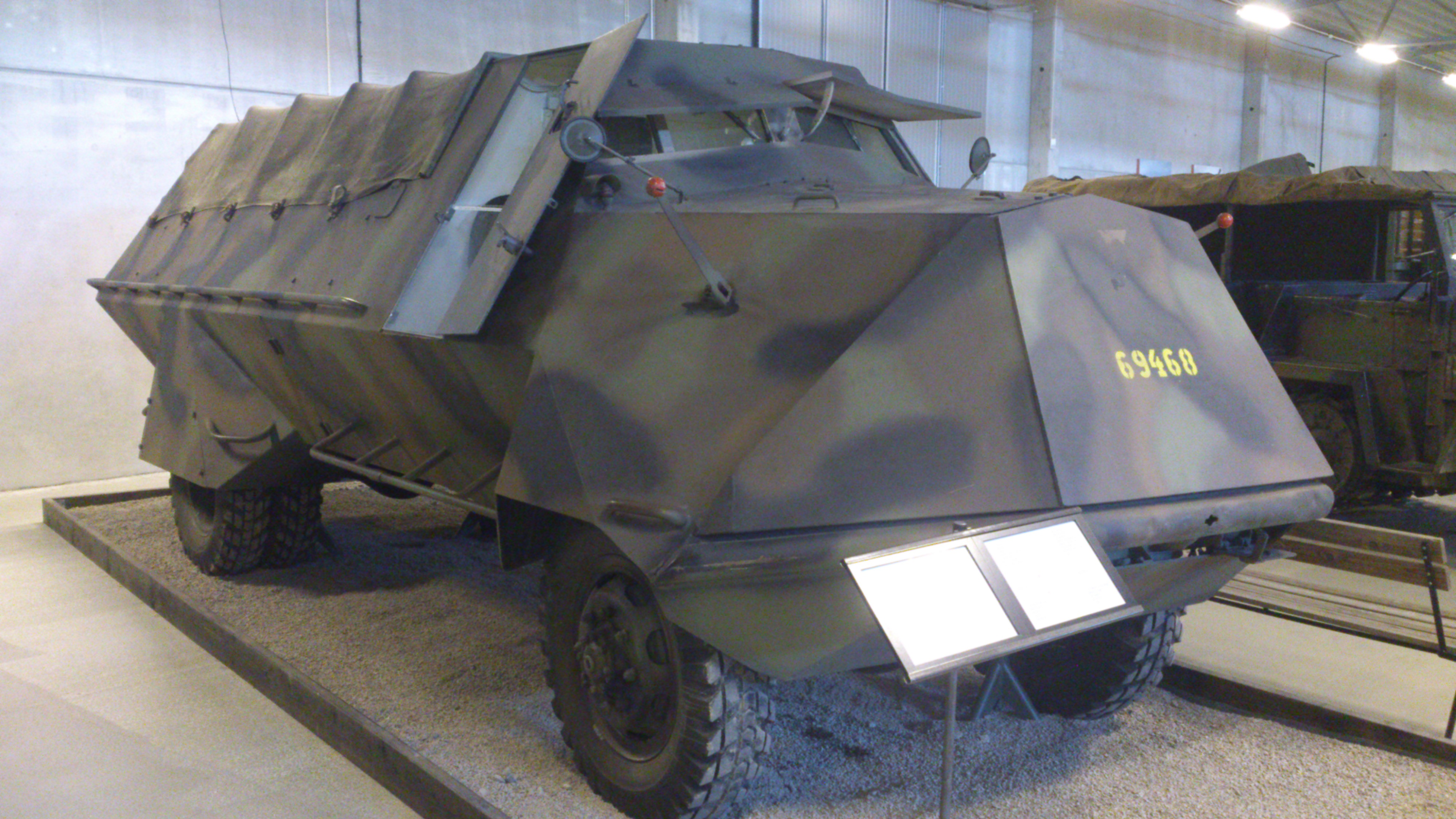
Terrängbil m/42 SKP.

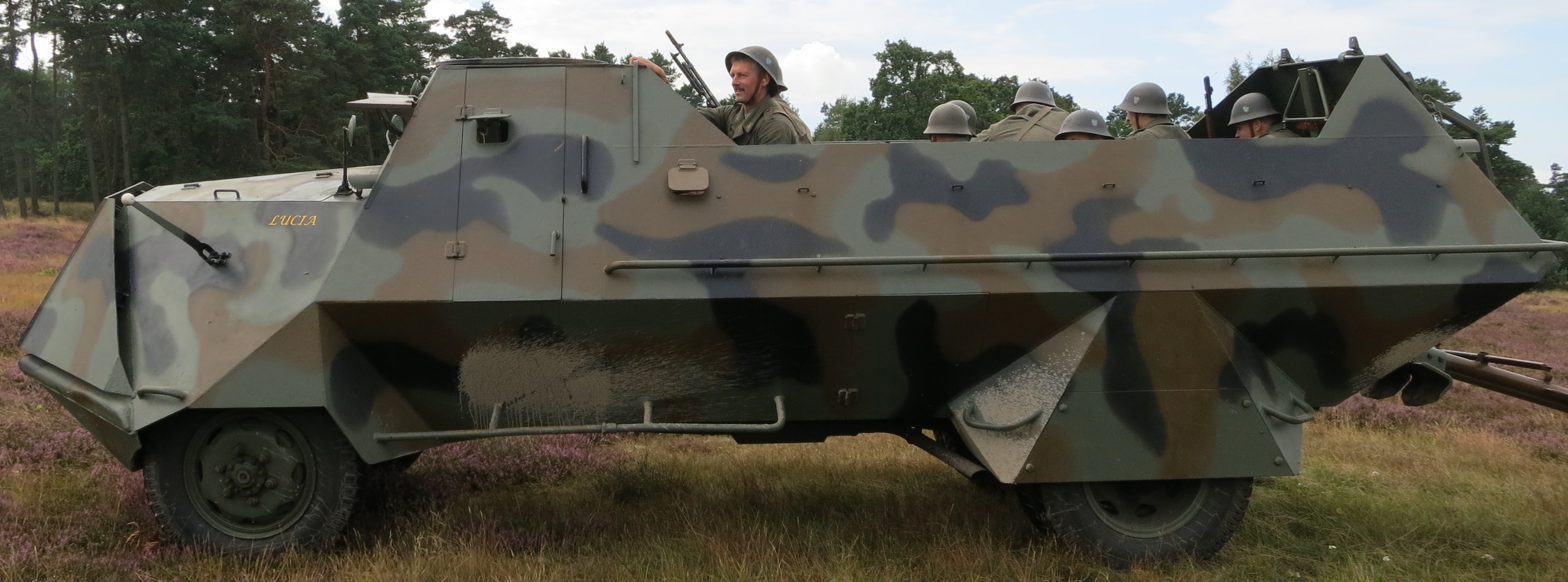
Terrängbil m/42 VKP.

SKP (Scania Karosseri Pansar) – Scania produced
300 total.

- Terrängbil m/42 SKP (tgb m/42 SKP) – 1944 config, open roof, unarmed/armed with a single-mount 8 mm ksp m/39 machine gun on the cabin.
- Terrängbil m/42 SKPF (tgb m/42 SKPF) – 1956 config, open roof, armed with twin-mount 8 mm ksp m/36 lv dbl anti-aircraft machine guns on the cabin (F-suffix = Fordonsluftvärn; vehicular anti-aircraft), 500 kg (1,100 lb) less load capacity.

VKP (Volvo Karosseri Pansar) – Volvo produced
200 total.

- Terrängbil m/42 VKP (tgb m/42 VKP) – 1944 config, open roof, unarmed/armed with a single-mount 8 mm ksp m/39 machine gun on the cabin.
- Terrängbil m/42 VKPF (tgb m/42 VKPF) – 1956 config, open roof, armed with twin-mount 8 mm ksp m/36 lv dbl anti-aircraft machine guns on the cabin (F-suffix = Fordonsluftvärn; vehicular anti-aircraft), 500 kg (1,100 lb) less load capacity.

=== REMO – 1983 ===
REMO = Renovation, Modifikation: 223 total (Scania KP only).

- Terrängbil m/42 D SKPF (tgb m/42 D SKPF) – closed roof with firing ports and back door, armed with two single-mount 7,62 mm ksp 58B light machine guns on the front and back end of the roof, six smoke grenade dischargers, spaced external front armour removed due to weight, new terrain wheels (wheelhouse reworked), servo brakes and new street legal lighting, 173 modified.
- Stabterrängbil m/42 A SKP (stabtgb m/42 A SKP) – Equal to the terrängbil m/42 D SKPF but intended as a command vehicle with internally integrated radios: three Ra 421, one Ra 195, + electronics, 16 modified.
- Sjukterrängbil 9521 A (sjtgb 9521 A) – military ambulance version of the terrängbil m/42 D SKPF, unarmed, 23 modified.
- Terrängbil m/42 E SKPF (tgb m/42 E SKPF) – coup defense version of the terrängbil m/42 D SKPF, one ksp 58B light machine gun in original m/36 twin-mount, 11 modified.

== Former operators ==
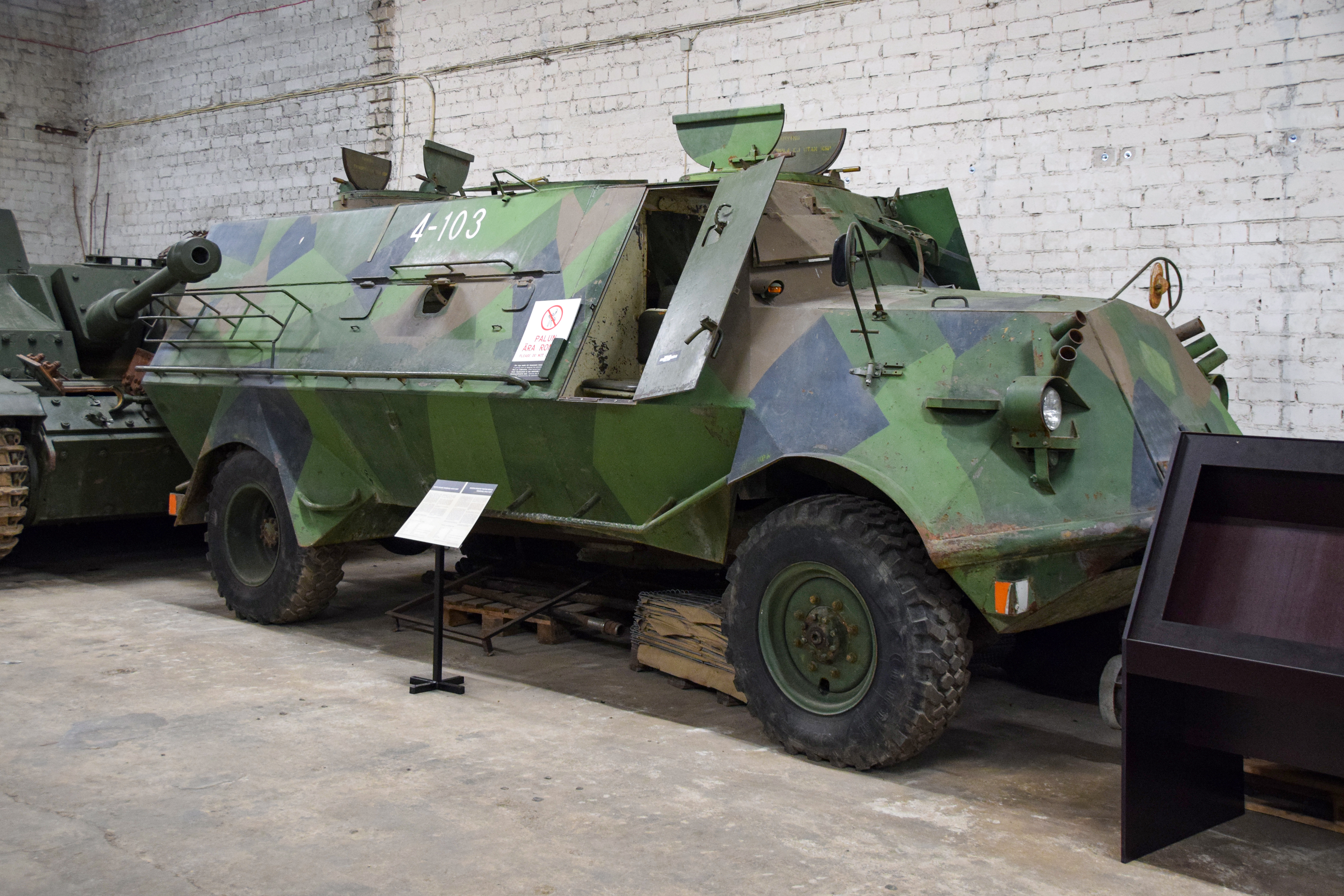
Estonian Terrängbil m/42 KP in the Estonian War Museum

- Sweden
- Estonia
- Latvia
- Lithuania

== See also ==
- List of modern armoured fighting vehicles
- Swedish Armed Forces
