= Pansarvärnskanonvagn m/43 =

Tank destroyer developed by Landsverk

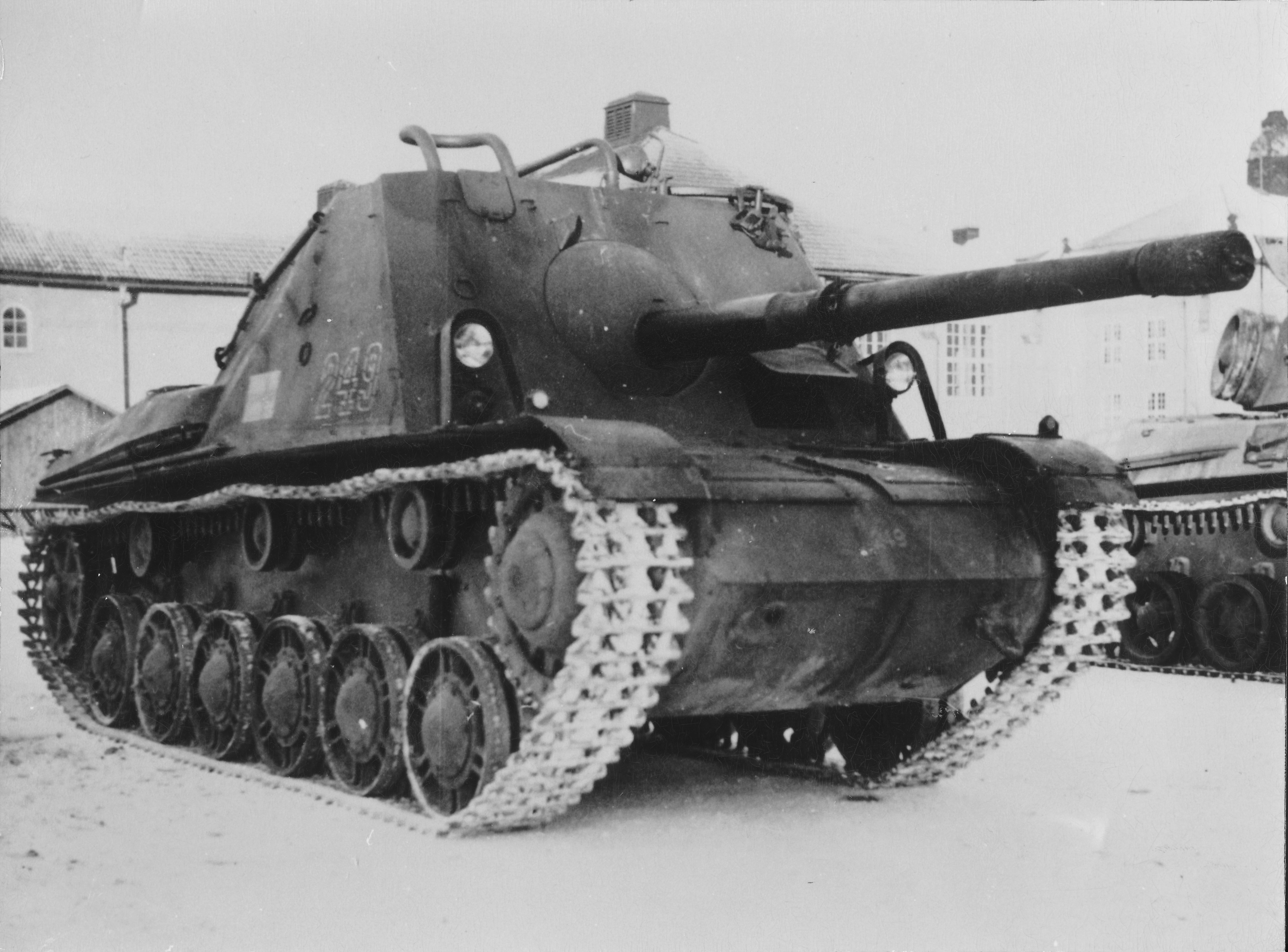
- Pansarvärnskanonvagn m/43 in Hässleholms Museum
- Type: Self-propelled anti-tank gun
- Place of origin: Sweden

Production history
- Designer: Landsverk
- Designed: 1942
- Manufacturer: Landsverk
- Produced: 1947-1948
- No. built: 87

Specifications (initial open top configuration)
- Mass: 25.0 t (55,100 lb)
- Length: 6.26 m (20 ft 6 in)
- Width: 2.35 m (7 ft 9 in)
- Height: 2.62 m (8 ft 7 in)
- Crew: 4 (commander, gunner, driver, loader)
- Armor: 9-70mm
- Main armament: 1 × 75mm Pvkan m/43 L/50.5
- Secondary armament: 1 x Ksp m/39 machine gun
- Engine: Volvo A8B (1947-63) 2 x Scania-Vabis L603 (1963-); 380 hp (1947-1963) 2x 160 hp (1963-)
- Suspension: torsion bar
- Maximum speed: 45 km/h (28 mph)

The Pansarvärnskanonvagn m/43 (Pvkv m/43) was a tank destroyer developed by Landsverk.

== History ==
As the use of tanks became more and more important during the Second World War, fighting them became more and more urgent. The German Wehrmacht had success with StuG III and StuG IV in this area. Therefore, the Swedish Army decided to emulate the StuG III and StuG IV examples and create a similar vehicle.

In 1942, Landsverk participated in this tank destroyer project and designed the new vehicle on the chassis of the Stridsvagn m/42.

== Description ==
The Pvkv m/43 was built on the chassis of the Stridsvagn m/42. It had a casemate design in place of a turret. The superstructure had an open top to reduce weight and a tarpaulin was used as protection against rain. The superstructure is located at the front of the vehicle and was slight sloped. The vehicle was operated by a crew of 4.

The primary armament of the Pvkv m/43 was a modified 75mm luftvärnskanon m/36 antiaircraft gun with a 50.5 caliber length barrel to increase the muzzle velocity for enhanced armour penetration. The gun traverse was only 15 degrees in both directions. Ammunition consisted of 56 rounds. Secondary armament was a Ksp m/39 machine gun.

The Pvkv m/43 was powered by a Volvo A8B engine that could output 380 hp. However, the Volvo A8B engine had reliability issues. Speed of the vehicle was 45 km/h. The Pvkv m/43 was also equipped with a new gearbox. The two front drive wheels of the vehicle also had to be reinforced to handle the weight of the new gun.

== Production ==
In 1942, Landsverk was given the order to produce 87 Pvkv m/43. In 1944, when the delivery of the vehicles should have started, only one prototype was built. The delay was due to the development of the new mechanical gearbox, which further postpone deliveries from 1946 to 1948.

== Development ==
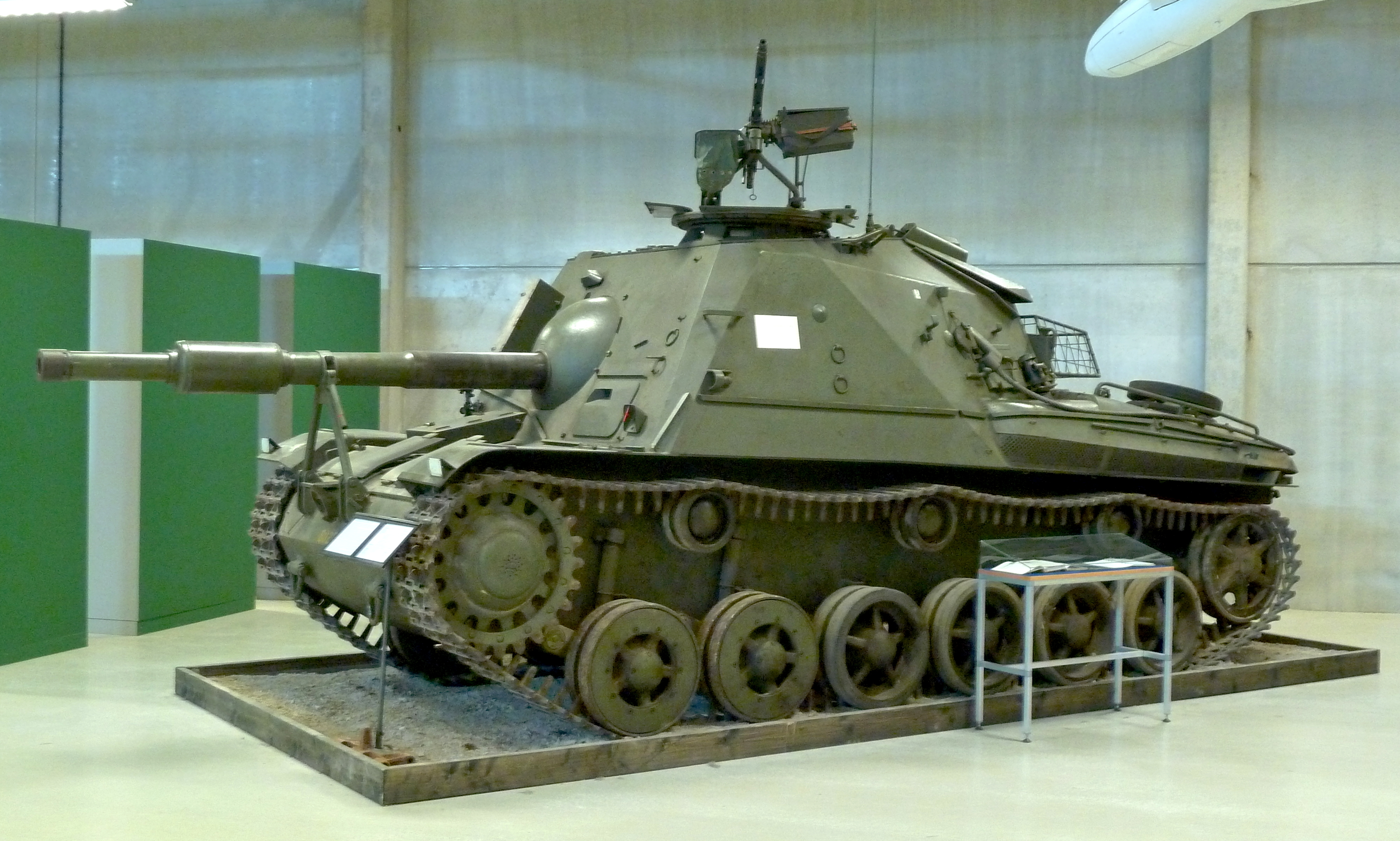
Upgraded Pvkv m/43 with armoured roof.

In 1954, the Army Materiel Administration provided all Pvkv m/43 with an armour roof over the open superstructure. This modification helped to protect the crew from shrapnel and sniper fire. Other modifications include the installation of a gas ejector, a muzzle brake and a gun mount for the gun to rest on.

In 1957, the withdrawal of Strv m/41 from frontline service made their two Scania-Vabis L603 engines available to replace the problematic Volvo A8B engine. In December 1960, three prototypes with the new engines was built by Landsverk and tested. The installation of the two Scania-Vabis L603 engines resulted in a more reliable vehicle but with a lower output of 320 hp compared to 380 hp. At the end of 1961, the order was given to refit the Pvkv m/43s and this was completed in 1963 to 1964.

The Pvkv m/43s were withdrawn from service in 1970. The guns were reused in fixed coastal defences, until they were dismantled in 1995.
