= Landsverk (name) =

Coordinates: 59°36′54″N 9°16′06″E

This is about the origin of the family name Landsverk. For the Swedish heavy industry manufacturer, see AB Landsverk.

Landsverk is the name of two forest farms located in the village of Lisleherad in Notodden Municipality, Norway.

The name means "land squeezed in between the river and mountain in each end", or "land squeezed". The cultivated land is of minor importance compared to the value of the forest. Forestry has been the basic income here for generations. Whilst agriculture has been subsidized by the state, the income from forestry has always been dependent upon world markets. The village of Lisleherad has the largest average size of privately owned forest properties in Norway.

The first written official document dates the Landsverk properties back to early 1300 (with buildings constructed before The Great Plague), while the neighbour farm, "Haave", ("viking temple") has buildings dated back to year 900. During Danish rule, the Danish king never achieved control in this part of Telemark, and the old families in Lisleherad still regard the land occupied by old Danish families like, Treschow, Lowenskiold and Cappelen as intruders and immigrants.
