= HSwMS Ejdern =

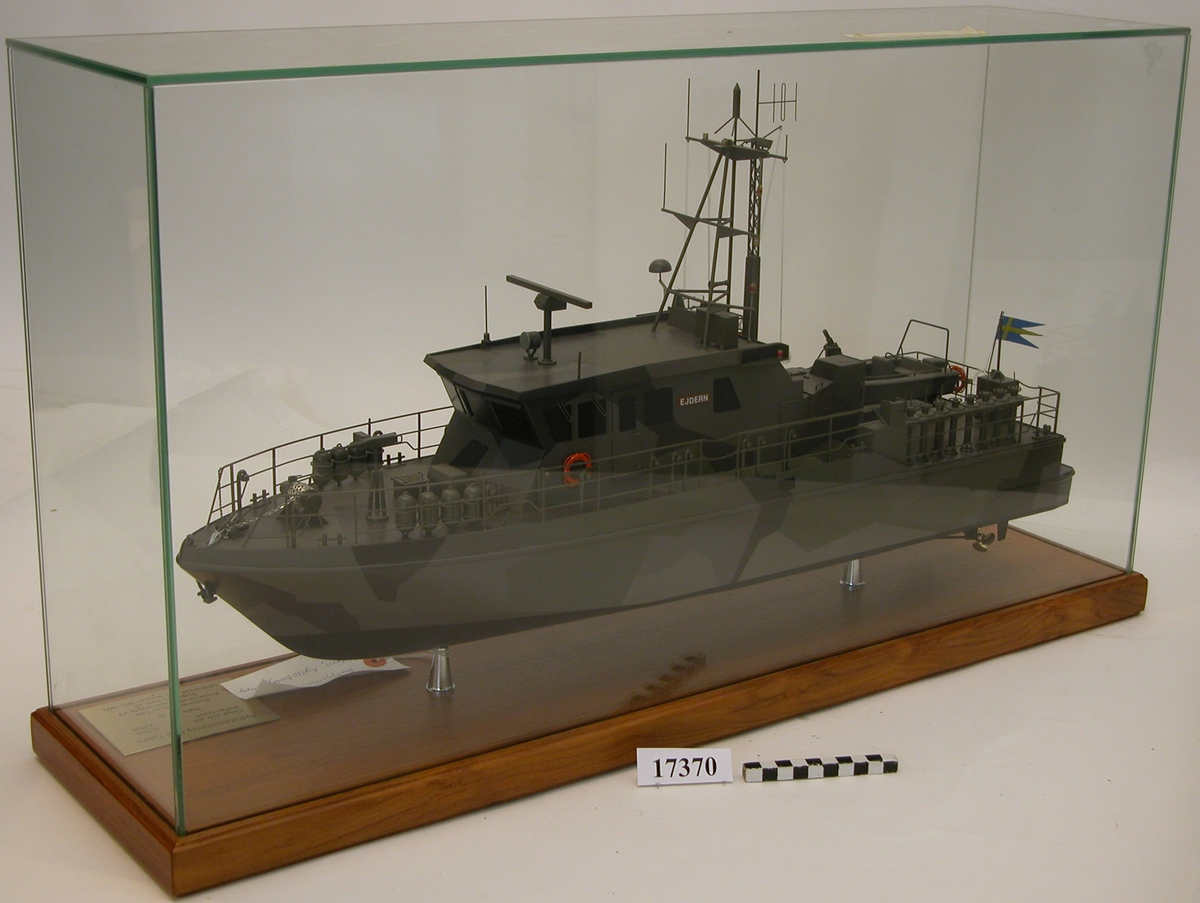

History
- Laid down: 1991
- Launched: 1991
- Commissioned: 1991
- Decommissioned: 2004
- Motto: Aures Arma Nostra

General characteristics
- Displacement: 38 tons
- Length: 19.99 meters
- Beam: 4.8 meters
- Draft: 1.35 meters
- Propulsion: 2 × VP TAMD 122A
- Speed: 17 knots (31 km/h; 20 mph)
- Range: 300 nautical miles (560 km; 350 mi)
- Complement: 3–4 officers, 6 conscripts
- Armament: 1 × 7.62 mm ksp 58

HSwMS Ejdern (B01) was the lead ship of her class of four Swedish sonobuoy boats.

== Bibliography ==
- Saunders, Stephen, ed. (2004). Jane's Fighting Ships 2004–2005. Coulsdon, UK: Jane's Information Group. ISBN 0-7106-2623-1.
