= Lvkv m/43 =

Swedish Anti-Aircraft Tank

Luftvärnsvärnskanonvagn m/43
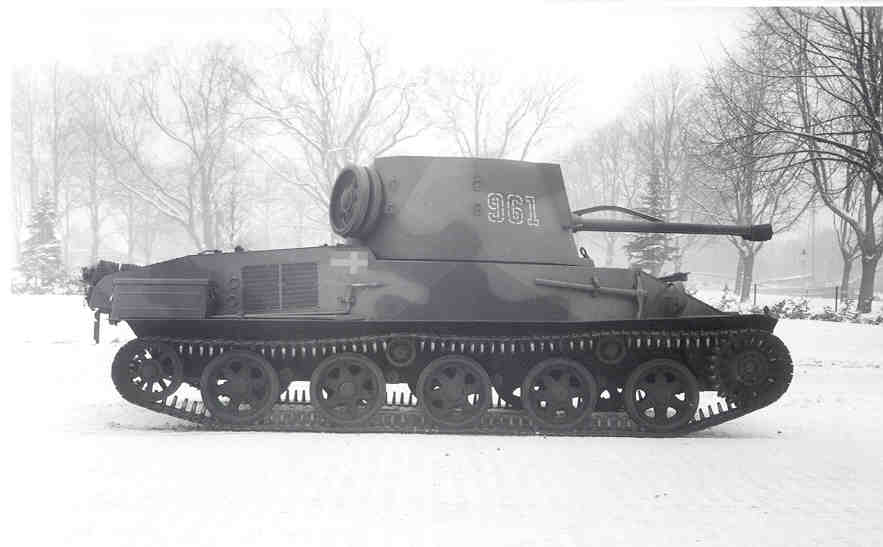
- Type: Self-propelled anti-aircraft weapon
- Place of origin: Sweden

Service history
- In service: 1947 - 1969
- Used by: Sweden

Production history
- Designer: AB Landsverk / Bofors
- Designed: 1943
- No. built: 17
- Variants: Lvkv fm/43 (1957)

Specifications
- Mass: 15.9 Tonnes
- Length: 5.79 m
- Width: 2.31 m
- Height: 2.26 m
- Crew: 4
- Armor: 9 - 15 mm
- Engine: Scania-Vabis L 603/3
- Transmission: Volvo VL-220
- Maximum speed: 36 kph (~22 mph)

The Lvkv m/43 (Luftvärnsvärnskanonvagn modell 1943) or "Anti-Aircraft Gun Carriage Model 1943" is a Swedish self-propelled anti-aircraft weapon developed by AB Landsverk and Bofors in 1943 out of the need for a tracked anti-aircraft vehicle to protect armored columns from air attack. Based on an elongated version of the hull of a Landsverk L-60 tank and mounting dual Bofors 40 mm L/60 guns the vehicle was adopted into service with the Swedish Army in 1947.

== Development and design ==
Due to the Swedish Air Force's inability to maintain air superiority in a potential conflict against a more powerful foe and the reorganization of the armored brigades of Sweden in 1942, the need arose within the Swedish Army for a vehicle that could protect movements of armored vehicles from air attack. An order was subsequently given to AB Landsverk to create 42 gun carriages mounting a 20mm anti-aircraft gun, however due to a variety of issues no prototype was ever delivered.

After this a formal order for 17 anti-aircraft vehicles mounting dual Bofors 40 mm L/60 automatic cannons as the main weaponry was placed from the Royal Armed Forces Administration (Kungliga Armeförvaltningen) to both AB Landsverk and Bofors, and formal development of a new vehicle began.

=== Chassis ===
The chassis of the tank was based on the already existing Landsverk L-60 tank chassis, modified and lengthened to contain an extra roadwheel. The tracks and engine were retained from the L-60 without change.

=== Turret ===
Based on the previously designed and produced Landsverk L-62 Anti I and Landsverk L-62 Anti II designs, the turret was essentially an enlarged and modified version made to mount the two larger Bofors 40 mm L/60 guns.

The turret was hydraulically powered allowing for a full 360 degree spin in only 7 seconds. The rate of fire was 120 rounds per minute, with 326 rounds being stored in the turret.

=== Assembly ===
The turrets were assembled in Karlskoga by Bofors before being sent to Landskrona by rail to Landsverk to be mounted onto the chassis to complete production. The first vehicles were delivered in 1947, and were designated Luftvärnkanonvagn fm/43, with fm being an abbreviation of "försöksmodell", meaning "experimental model". It is unclear why this "experimental" designation was given.

== Performance ==
It was clear from the start that the initial vehicles had many problems. The tracks were much too narrow to compensate for the additional 7 tons added in comparison to the L-60, which caused the vehicle to sink into the ground due to the increased ground pressure, causing problems with the track and suspension system breaking and malfunctioning. Along with this, the vehicle was now badly underpowered, causing performance in relation to speed to be inadequate, only being able to reach 36 kph (22 mph). The Lengthening of the hull also proved to be problematic, as the vehicle was hard to steer with the unfavorable ratio of length to width. It was also not possible to fight effectively using the vehicle in bad weather conditions as the vehicle was only equipped with optical sights.

=== Upgrades (Lvkv fm/43 (1957)) ===
In 1948 all vehicles delivered in the previous year were given wider tracks to fix the ground pressure issue, and all vehicles that hadn't been delivered yet were fitted with these wider tracks from the production line. In 1950 / 1951 the underpowered engines were swapped for 300 hk Maybach HL120 TRM engines taken from Germany after the end of World War 2. The engines were nearly twice as powerful, pushing the top speed of the vehicle to 55 kph (34 mph). Many other smaller upgrades and changes were made throughout the 1950s, such as the addition of an armored box to the turret for mounting an Ra 400 Radio with the spare wheels required to be carried on Swedish vehicles being placed atop this box. These upgrades made the vehicle slightly larger and heavier at 17 tonnes. The issue of being unable to fight in bad weather was never fixed.

== End of service ==
Despite the upgrades in 1948 and the early 1950s, the vehicle was never truly good, and never outgrew its initial problems. Even considering their initial purpose, too few of them were produced to fulfill the role they were built for. Plans were made in 1949 to replace the vehicles with the production of 275 new vehicles, with plans for the Luftvärnsvärnskanonvagn m/42 being drawn up but never produced due to economic problems.

In accordance to the reorganization of Swedish armored brigades once again in 1963, the vehicles were taken out of service and eventually scrapped in 1969 with no vehicle produced that would replace it.
