= Landsverk L-100 and 101 =

Ultra light tank designs

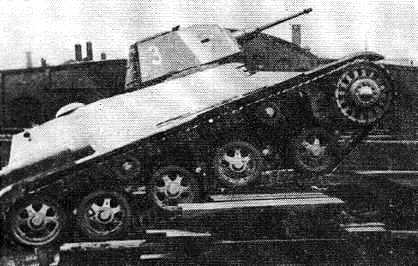
Swedish Landsverk L-100 tank Date: 1930

Landsverk L-100 (L-100) was a prototype design by AB Landsverk in 1933–34. It was designed as an ultra-light tank weighing just 4.5 tonnes. It was armed with a single machine gun, Its max speed was 55km/h. It never entered service with the Swedish army.

Landsverk L-101 was an ultra-light weight tank destroyer armed with a 20 mm Cannon. This design never got beyond the drawing board.
