= AB Landsverk =

Swedish heavy industry company

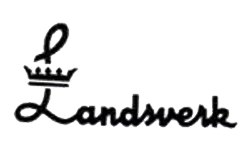
Landsverk's logotype

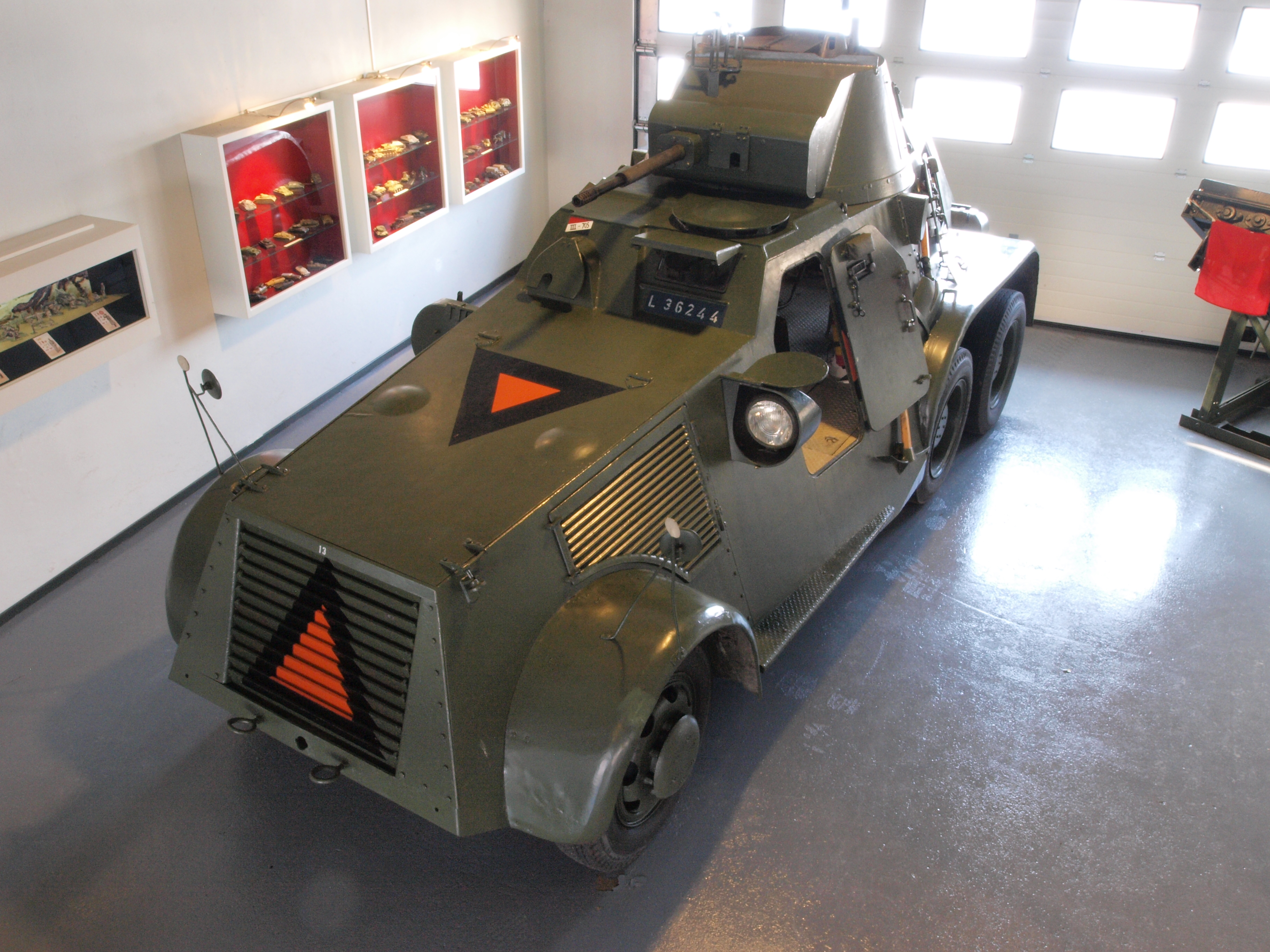
Landsverk M38 top view

AB Landsverk (full name: Aktiebolaget Landsverk, lit. 'The Corporation Landsverk') was a Swedish heavy industry company, manufacturing a wide variety of tracked and wheeled military vehicles, such as tractor units, off-road vehicles and armoured vehicles, etc., most notably the world's first welded tank constructions, among others, but also a wide variety of civilian heavy equipment, such as railroad cars, harbour cranes and agricultural machinery.

It was founded in 1872 as Firman Petterson & Ohlsen. It was located in Landskrona, Sweden.

== Early days ==
In late 1920, the company found itself on the verge of bankruptcy. Through a German company, the Gutehoffnungshütte Aktienverein für Bergbau und Hüttenbereich Oberhausen (GHH), invested heavily and gained control of 50 % of the shares.

In 1923, the company manufactured a small number of tracked agricultural tractors based on an American design. The Germans increased their ownership to 61% in 1925 and three years later the name was changed to AB Landsverk. In 1929, the German engineer Otto Merker was assigned to Landsverk to develop armoured vehicles, a few prototypes of a German design with both wheels and tracks were manufactured in Landskrona named L-5, but never went into production. The Stridsvagn M/21-29 was a German design with a Swedish engine and was produced in Sweden by both AB Landsverk and AB Nohab. The In 1930, the Swedish Army placed an order of armoured car for trials, and a few years later three light tanks on wheels and tracks.

In 1933, Lithuania ordered six, in 1935, the Netherlands ordered twelve Landsverk L181 and in 1937, an order of thirteen L-180 armoured cars. Landsverk presented the L-60 in 1934, the first tank with torsion-bar suspension. There was some very limited export of armoured cars to other countries like Denmark and Finland. Hungary manufactured the L-60 by license as the Toldi. Mid-thirties Hungary ordered a further developed armoured car with heavier armament and thicker armor. This design was completed in 1938 and became the new Landsverk Lago. The Landsverk anti-II was an AA variant of this tank.

Landsverk built a few L-120 light tanks in the 1930s, one of which was exported to Norway; it was the first tank operated by the Norwegian Army.

== The modern era ==
During the Second World War, Landsverk designed and partly manufactured, most of the Swedish Army's tanks. At the conclusion of that conflict, Landsverk was subject to an effort to dismantle German foreign business interests. Landsverk was confiscated by the Swedish state and, through its Flyktkapitalbyrån agency, sold to Kockums.

The Irish Army operated several Landsverk vehicles over the last 80 years. Two L-60 tanks were purchased in 1935 as training vehicles to supplement the single Vickers Mk D. Although, three tanks were of dubious military value, however, budget constraints prevented additional purchases. Both were out of service by 1953 due to a lack of tracks. Both are still in existence, whilst one has been restored to working condition.

The Irish Army also used the L-180 armoured car. The type was adopted to replace the aging Rolls-Royce amoured cars in 1937. Eight were delivered by 1939, but the last five on order were never delivered due to the outbreak of the Second World War (they were instead taken over and used by Sweden). The same was the case with many other vehicles in the Irish Army, budget constraints meant that the L180s were still in front-line service (albeit up-gunned with 20mm cannon) until 1972. Incredibly, they were then transferred to the Irish Army Reserve, the FCA, where they were kept in service until the mid-1980s. Five are preserved, including one donated to the Swedish Army.

The Landsverk Company produced an armoured scout car based on the Unimog S404 in the late 1950s. The Irish Army purchased 15 of the vehicles (originally intended for the police force in the Belgian Congo), in 1971 at a bargain price. They were intended as a stop-gap vehicle for use until the first Panhard M3 VTT APCs entered service in 1972. The type had excellent off-road capability but poor on-road handling due to a high centre of gravity and several accidents occurred as a result. A four-man dismountable squad arrangement was carried, but space was cramped and in any case a four-man detachment was far too small for any sort of realistic military purpose. Other criticisms were that the gunner's position was too exposed. Eventually the Unimog Scout Cars arrived in Ireland in February 1972, their departure having been delayed by a local peace group who thought they were destined for the Provisional Irish Republican Army. By mid-1978 all had been transferred to the Irish Army Reserve, the FCA. All were withdrawn by 1984, two are preserved; one in the transport museum in Howth, County Dublin and one in England.

== Vehicles produced by AB Landsverk ==
Military equipment by AB Landsverk
Name	Year	Variants	Type	Status	Main armament/Notes
Strv m/21-29	1929	-	tank	Swedish service	6.5mm Ksp m/14-29 machine gun × 1
L-5	1929	-	tank	Prototype	37 mm cannon × 1
L-10	1929	-	tank	Swedish service	Bofors 37 mm gun × 1
L-30	1931	-	tank	Prototype	Bofors 37 mm × 1
L-60	1934	L-60	light tank	Export	Madsen 20 mm cannon × 1
L-60	1934	L-60Ö (Österrike "Austria")	tank	Export	Madsen 20 mm cannon × 1
L-60	1934	Toldi I	tank	Export	20 mm Solothurn S-18/100 anti-tank rifle × 1
L-60	1934	Original Toldi I plan	tank	Blueprint	25 mm Bofors autocannon × 1
L-60	1934	Suggested Swedish version	tank	Blueprint	25 mm Bofors autocannon × 1
L-60	1934	Strv m/48	tank	Blueprint	Bofors 25 mm M/32 × 1
L-60	1934	L-60 (export alternative)	tank	Blueprint	Madsen AT-gun × 1
L-60	1934	L-60S I (Strv m/38)	tank	Swedish service	Bofors 37 mm strvkan m/38 × 1
L-60	1934	L-60S II (Strv m/39)	tank	Swedish service	37 mm Bofors strvkan m/38 × 1
L-60	1934	L-60S III (Strv m/40L)	tank	Swedish service	37 mm Bofors strvkan m/38 × 1
L-60	1934	L-60S V (Strv m/40K)	tank	Swedish service	37 mm Bofors strvkan m/38 × 1
L-60	1934	Suggested Swedish version	tank	Blueprint	37 mm Bofors autocannon × 1
L-60	1934	Pvkv IV Värjan	tank destroyer	Prototype	57 mm PvKan m/43 × 1
L-62	1936	Anti (concept)	SPAAG	Drawing board only	40mm QF 2 pounder pom-pom × 1
L-62	1936	Anti I	SPAAG	Export -1 example built, licensed to Hungary and developed as 40M Nimród	40mm Bofors L/60 × 1
L-62	1936	Anti II	SPAAG	Export - 6 for Finland	40mm Bofors L/60 × 1
L-63, L64, L-65	1933	-	SPAAG	Unbuilt designs	Bofors 25 mm m/32 , Oerlikon 20 mm cannon , 47mm AA gun respectively
L-80	1933	-	tank	Blueprint	20 mm Madsen autocannon × 1
L-100	1934	Prototype	Light tank	Prototype	6.5 mm Ksp m/14-29 machine gun × 1
L-100	1934	Suggestion	Light tank	Blueprint	20 mm Madsen autocannon × 1
L-101	1934	-	Tank destroyer	Blueprint	20 mm Madsen autocannon × 1
L-110	1933	-	tank	Prototype	Unknown
L-120	1937	Norwegian version	Light tank	Export/Prototype	7.92 mm Colt M/29 ksp × 1
L-120	1937	Swedish version	Light tank	Prototype	8 mm Ksp m/36 machine gun × 2
L-120	1937	Export	Light tank	Blueprint	20 mm Madsen autocannon × 1
L-131	1934	-	artillery tractor	Export to Siam	
L-132	1934	-	artillery tractor	Export to Siam	
L-135	1936	L-135	artillery tractor	Export to siam	
L-135	1936	L-135S	artillery tractor	Prototype	Swedish prototype
L-140	1936	-	artillery tractor/SPAAG	Prototype	3.7 cm Flak 36 × 1: SPAAG conversion
L-140	1936	-	artillery tractor/SPAAG	Prototype	40 mm LvAkan m/36 × 1: SPAAG conversion
L-170	1930	Pbil fm/29	Armored car	Prototype	37 mm Marinkanon 98B cannon × 1
L-180	1935	Autocannon version	Armored car	Export	20 mm Madsen autocannon × 1
L-180	1935	PV M36	Armored car	Export	20 mm Madsen autocannon × 1
L-180	1935	Pbil m/41	Armored car	Swedish service	Bofors akan m/40 × 1
L-180	1935	AT-cannon version	Armored car	Export	37 mm Madsen AT-gun × 1
L-181	1933	Autocannon version	Armored car	Export	Oerlikon 20 mm cannon × 1
L-181	1933	AT-cannon version	Armored car	Export	37 mm Bofors anti-tank gun × 1
L-182	1935	L-182	Armored car	Export	13.2 mm L-35/36 machine gun × 1
L-182	1935	L-182A	Armored car	Field mod	20 mm Lahti L-39 anti-tank rifle × 1
L-185	1933	PV M34	Armored car	Export	20 mm Madsen akan × 1
L-190	1932	-	Armored motorcycle	Prototype	6.5 mm Ksp m/14-29 machine gun × 1
L-210	1938	-	Armored motorcycle	Prototype	8 mm Madsen machine gun × 1
Transportvagn	1934	-	Transport wagon	Export	A transport wagon for Siam
Strålkastarvagn	1934	SIA Stockholm (Stockholms version)	Searchlight wagon	Swedish service	A searchlight wagon named SIA
Strålkastarvagn	1934	SIA	Searchlight wagon	Swedish service	A searchlight wagon named SIA
Lynx	1938	PV M/39	Armored car	Export	20 mm Madsen autocannon × 1
Lynx	1938	Pbil m/39	Armored car	Swedish service	20 mm Bofors akan m/40 × 1
Lynx	1938	Pbil m/40 (Volvo version)	Armored car	Swedish service	20 mm Bofors akan m/40 × 1
Lago	1938	Lago I (Hungarian variant)	Medium tank	Prototype	40 mm MÁVAG cannon × 1
Lago	1938	Lago I (Export variant)	Medium tank	Blueprint	Skoda 47 mm cannon × 1
Lago	1938	Lago I (Swedish variant)	Medium tank	Blueprint	57 mm Bofors anti-tank gun × 1
Lago	1938	Lago II (Strv m/42 TM)	Medium tank	Swedish service	75 mm Bofors strvkan m/41 L31 × 1
Lago	1938	Lago III (Strv m/42 TH)	Medium tank	Swedish service	75 mm Bofors strvkan m/41 L31 × 1
Lago	1938	Lago IV (Strv m/42 EH)	Medium tank	Swedish service	75 mmBofors strvkan m/41 L31 × 1
Lago	1938	Strv m/42 TV	Medium tank	Swedish service	75 mmBofors strvkan m/41 L31 × 1
Lago	1938	Strv m/42 DT (Delat torn)	Medium tank	Prototype	75 mmPvkan L/54 m/43 strv × 1
Lago	1938	Ikv 73	Assault gun	Swedish service	75 mm Bofors strvkan m/41 L31 × 1
Terro	1941	L-60 IV	tank	Blueprint	37 mm Bofors strvkan m/38 × 1
KP-bil	1942	1942 version	APC	Swedish service	-
KP-bil	1942	1956 version	APC	Swedish service/Export	2× 8 mm Ksp m/39 machine gun
KP-bil	1942	1980 version	APC	Swedish service	2× 7.62 mm Ksp 58 machine gun
Bandtraktor	1942	-	artillery tractor	Swedish service	License built Allis-Chalmers M
Skogsbrandvagn	1943	-	Fire fighting vehicle	Prototype	Foam cannon × 1
Pvkv m/43	1943	1946 version, 1954 upgrade, 1963 re-engined	Tank destroyer	Swedish service	1 × Bofors 75 mm Model 1929
Lvkv fm/43	1943	Lvkv fm/43-47, fm/43-57	SPAAG	Swedish service	40 mm Bofors L/60 lvakan m/36/43 × 2
Sländan	1944	-	Self-propelled armored sled	Prototype	A self-propelled armored sled called sländan
Pricken	1944	Pricken m/44	Medium tank	Blueprint	75 mm Pvkan L54 m/43 strv × 1
Pricken	1944	Pricken m/48 pvkan m/43	Medium tank	Blueprint	75 mm Pvkan L54 m/43 strv × 1
Pricken	1944	Pricken m/48 pvkan m/48	Medium tank	Blueprint	105 mm Pvkan m/48 × 1
Strv m/46	1946	LS 46	Medium tank	Blueprint	105 mm Lvkan m/42 × 1
Strv m/46	1946	TLS 47	Medium tank	Blueprint	105 mm Lvkan m/42 × 1
Pvkv m/46	1946	LP 46	Tank destroyer	Blueprint	105 mm Lvkan m/42 × 1
Pvkv m/46	1946	TLP 47	Tank destroyer	Blueprint	105 mm Lvkan m/42 × 1
Leo	1948	Leo pvkan m/43	Medium tank	Blueprint	75 mm Pvkan L/54 m/43 strv × 1
Leo	1948	Leo kan m/34	Medium tank	Blueprint	105 mm Kanon m/34 × 1
Lansen	1948	Lansen m/48	Light tank	Blueprint	75 mm Pvkan L/54 m/43 strv × 1
Lansen	1948	Lansen m/50 pvkan L/57	Light tank	Blueprint	84 mm Pvkan L/57 × 1
Lansen	1948	Lansen m/50 pvkan L/65	Light tank	Blueprint	84 mm Pvkan L/65 × 1
Lansen	1948	Lansen m/51 pvkan L/65	Light tank	Blueprint	84 mm Pvkan L/65 × 1
Lansen	1948	Lansen m/51 pvkan L/60	Light tank	Blueprint	90 mm Pvkan L/60 × 1
Lansen	1948	Lansen m/51S pvkan L/60	Light tank	Blueprint	90 mm Pvkan L/60 × 1
Lansen	1948	Lansen m/51S strvkan fm/49	Light tank	Blueprint	105 mm Strvkan fm/49 × 1
Lansen	1948	Lansen m/51S strvkan fm/50	Light tank	Blueprint	105 mm Strvkan L/40 fm/50 × 1
Pilen	1948	-	Light tank	Blueprint	75 mm StrvKan m/41 L31 × 1
Lvkv 42 (fm/49)	1948	-	SPAAG	Prototype	40 mm Bofors L/70 lvakan m/47 × 1
Pvkv II	1949	Pvkv III	Tank destroyer	Prototype	57 mm PvKan m/43 × 1
Pvkv II	1949	Pvkv II	Tank destroyer	Prototype	75 mm LvKan m/36 × 1
Pbv T fm/49	1949	-	APC	Prototype	8mm Ksp m/39 B strv × 3
Ikv 72	1953	Ikv 72	Assault gun	Swedish service	75 mm StrvKan m/41 L31 × 1
Ikv 72	1953	Ikv 102	Assault gun	Swedish service	105 mm Ikvkan m/55 ikv L/22 × 1
Ikv 103	1956	-	Assault gun	Swedish service	105 mm Ikvkan m/55 ikv L/22 × 1
Kranvagn	1955	EMIL 1951	Heavy tank	Blueprint	120 mm L/40 smoothbore autocannon × 1
Kranvagn	1955	EMIL 1	Heavy tank	Blueprint	150 mm L/40 smoothbore autocannon × 1
Kranvagn	1955	EMIL 2	Heavy tank	Blueprint	150 mm L/40 smoothbore autocannon × 1
Kranvagn	1955	EMIL 3	Heavy tank	Prototype	150 mm L/40 smoothbore autocannon × 1
Kranvagn	1955	Strv K	MBT	Blueprint	105 mm Royal Ordnance L7 × 1
Pansarbil Unimog	1956	Irish Bren variant	Armored car	Export	7.62 mm Bren machine gun × 1
Pansarbil Unimog	1956	Irish Colt variant	Armored car	Export	7.62 mm Colt machine gun × 1
Pansarbil Unimog	1956	Ethiopian variant	Armored car	Export	7.62 mm Madsen-Saetter machine gun × 2
Pansarbil Unimog	1956	Ethiopian modification	Armored car	Export	75 mm M20 recoilless rifle × 1
Pansarbil Unimog	1956	Unimog with 8 cm rocket launchers	Armored car	Prototype	Oerlikon 8 cm rocket launcher × 2
Pansarbil Unimog	1956	Unimog with 90 mm recoilless rifles	Armored car	Blueprint	2x 90 mm Pvpj 1110 recoilless guns
Strv 74	1957	Strv 74 H, 74V	tank	Swedish service	75 mm Kanon strv 74 × 1
Pbv 301	1957	Pbv 301, Pbv 3011, Pbv 3012	Infantry fighting vehicle	Swedish service	20 mm Akan m/45 B × 1
Strv A	1958		MBT	Blueprint	105 mm autocannon or 120 mm Pvkan
Strv T	1958	-	MBT	Blueprint	105 mm Royal Ordnance L7 × 1
Strv S	1956	Strv 103A, 103B, 103C, 103D (prototype only)	MBT	Swedish service	105 mm Bofors L/62 × 1
Akv 151	1960	-	Self-propelled artillery	Prototype	155 mm Akan m/60 × 1
Bandkanon 1	1964	Bkan 1A, 1B (prototype only), 1C	Self-propelled artillery	Swedish service	155 mm Akan m/60 × 1
Lvkv VEAK 40	1964	-	SPAAG	Prototype	40 mm Bofors L/70 lvakan m/47 × 2
Pbv 302	1965	Pbv 302A, 302B, 302C	APC	Swedish service	20 mm Hispano-Suiza (Akan m/47D) × 1
Ikv 91	1969	1969 version, 1975 version	Assault gun/Tank destroyer	Swedish service	90 mm Bofors L/54 räfflad pvkan × 1
