= Emil (tank) =

Swedish heavy tank design project

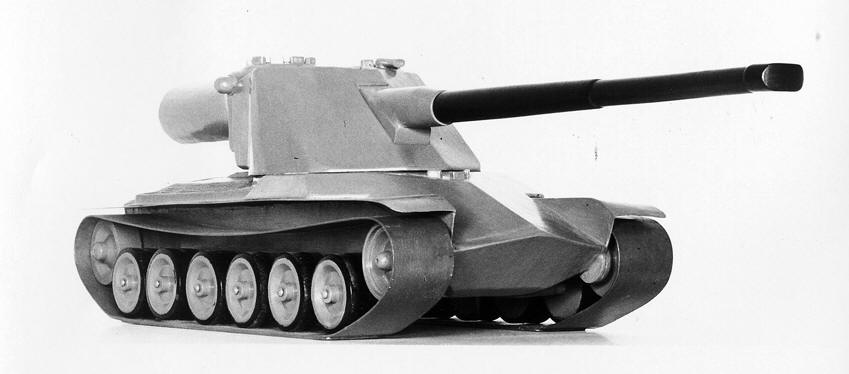
Emil tank model

Heavy tank project Emil (project number: 6400), known under the cover name of Kranvagn ("crane wagon") or KRV for short, was a heavy tank developed secretly in Sweden during the early 1950s. The intention was to replace the Swedish Army's disparate tank fleet with a tank that could counter the Soviet IS series heavy tanks and be upgraded continuously. The initial design, in 1950, proposed mounting a 10.5 cm autoloader fed gun in an oscillating turret. Due to its size, weight, and power-to-weight it was considered by many to be more of a medium tank than a heavy tank.

The project was discontinued during development and only two chassis were built. They were later rebuilt and served as testing platforms for the Artillerikanonvagn 151 and Stridsvagn 103 projects.

== Project ==
At the end of World War II, it was clear that the mix of tanks in service in the Swedish Armed Forces was not just obsolete but also presented a large logistical problem. Kungliga Arméförvaltningens Tygavdelning (KAFT) conducted a study that concluded that the most cost-effective alternative would be to purchase the newly developed Centurion Mk 3, which while quite modern was judged to have upgrade potential for future requirements. A request of purchase was sent to the United Kingdom, but the reply was that no deliveries could be made before the needs of the British Army had been met first which was expected to take between five and 15 years.

In 1951, the vehicle bureau of KAFT set about to develop an indigenous manufactured alternative, which they did in great secrecy under the guise of constructing a mobile crane. Parallel with this, negotiations were entered with France about buying the AMX-13 light tank. All this came to an abrupt halt when the British in early December 1952 offered to sell the desired Centurions immediately in order to earn needed foreign currency. The Swedish Minister for Defence, Torsten Nilsson, ended the debate about the future tank purchase by (on his own initiative) signing a deal with the British at the beginning of 1953 with the first Centurion deliveries, as the Stridsvagn 81, taking place in April 1953. The delegation in France was forced to depart under heavy apologies while the EMIL-project was terminated.

A consortium of Landsverk, Bofors and Volvo suggested to revive it for the Försvarsbeslut 1958 (white paper of Swedish defence policies 1958) where the replacement for the now ageing Centurions were to be decided upon. EMIL was however regarded as too costly and instead the S-tank proposal was put forward for the final draft which it won and it subsequently became the Stridsvagn 103.

== Construction ==
The testing of the German Panther and the French AMX 13 tanks in Sweden heavily influenced the initial 1951 design for the Emil project. The known documented statistics for the initial 1951 "Emil" were to be as follows:

- Armour:
  - Turret front – 180mm @ 45degs horizontal = 212mm effective thickness
  - Cheek, front on – 125mm @ 35 deg vertical = 218mm
- Cheek, side on – 125mm @ 80 deg horizontal = 127mm
  - Side – 30mm
  - Rear – 30mm
  - Hull UFP – 100mm @ 22 deg horizontal = 187mm
  - Hull LFP – 125mm @ 38 deg horizontal = 203mm
  - Hull side – 20 mm
  - Hull rear – 30 mm
- Engine: 550 hp
- Weight: 25.6 t
- Power to weight: 20.19 hp/t
- Gun depression/elevation: -14 (-15 to sides) / +15

In 1952, the Emil project progressed to be a counter to the Soviet IS-3 tank which influenced the shape of the hull while the oscillating turret was redesigned. The schematics for the three designs were split into four parts; frontal armor, side/rear armor, engine and armament. For the first studies and trials a chassis which resembled a low IS-7 was built.

There were multiple armor thicknesses considered for both the front and the side which caused a variation in projected weight between the Emil 1, Emil 2 and Emil 3.

Frontal armour configurations
Scheme	Turret front	Hull upper front	Hull lower front
Alt A	140 mm at 44 - 40° (201-217 mm equivalent)	75mm @ 25° (177 mm equivalent)	120mm @ 38° (195 mm equivalent)
Alt B	170 mm at 44 - 40° (244-264 mm equivalent)	95mm @ 25° (224 mm equivalent)	145mm @° (235 mm equivalent)

Armour configuration
	Turret side	hull side	hull rear
Emil 1	40 mm	20 mm	30 mm
Emil 2	60 mm	30 mm	30 mm
Emil 3	80 mm	40 mm	40 mm

Two main options were considered for armament, a 120 mm calibre rifled gun and a 150 mm calibre smoothbore gun, both around 40 calibres long. Regardless of gun choice the ammunition would be fed from a dual-drum autoloader allowing for quick selection of ordnance - armour-piercing or high explosive. A new prototype ammunition was tested, which was to be a combination of HEAT and APDS. In case of failure, a back up armament was chosen: a 67-calibre long 105 mm rifled gun.

Each design was to have a different engine;

- Emil 1: 6-cylinder AOS-895 (500 hp)
- Emil 2: 8-cylinder AV-1195 (540 hp) or 8-cylinder AVS-1195 (665 hp)
- Emil 3: 12-cylinder AV-1790 (810 hp)

During testing of the 12 cylinder AV-1790 engine on the Kranvagn hull it was discovered that - after losses driving the cooling and other equipment - the engine was only delivering 723 hp to the drive wheels.

There were six variations for each Emil plan giving 18 variations in total. Weight varied between 30.7 t for the Emil I A1 to 41.8 t for the Emil III B3. Ultimately the Emil III B3 was the preferred option. The turret side armor (80 mm) and rear armor (40 mm) was to be dropped to 70 mm at the side and 30 mm at the rear to improve gun stability as well as gun elevation.
