= Landsverk L-60 =

Strv L-60
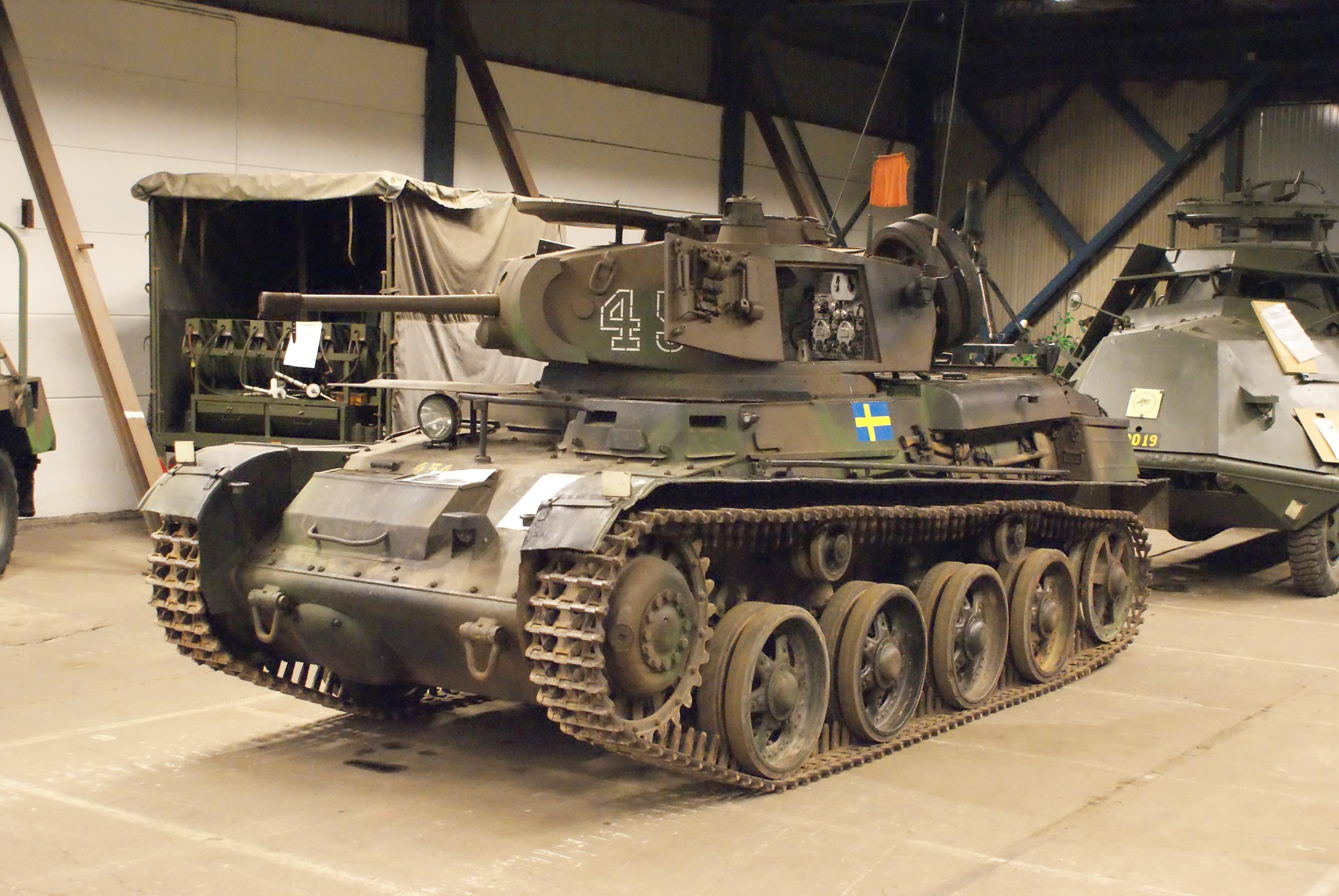
- Stridsvagn m/40K at the Hässlehoms Museum, Sweden
- Type: Light tank
- Place of origin: Sweden

Service history
- In service: 1935 – 2002
- Used by: Sweden; Kingdom of Hungary; Ireland; Dominican Republic
- Wars: World War II (see Toldi tanks); Dominican Civil War

Production history
- Designer: Otto Merker
- Designed: 1934
- Manufacturer: AB Landsverk
- Variants: L-60; L-60 Ö L-60 S Strv m/38 Strv m/39 Strv m/40L; Strv m/40K; Toldi tanks (Hungarian made tanks based on the L-60)

Specifications (Original Landsverk L-60 specifications)
- Mass: 8.5 t (8.4 long tons; 9.4 short tons) (laden)
- Length: 4.8 m (15 ft 9 in)
- Width: 2.075 m (6 ft 9.7 in)
- Height: 2.05 m (6 ft 9 in)
- Crew: 3
- Armor: 5–15 mm (0.20–0.59 in)
- Main armament: Madsen 20 mm cannon
- Secondary armament: 7.92 mm Madsen machine gun
- Engine: Bussing-Nag V8 cylinder 7.9 litres 150-160 bhp at 2500-2700 rpm
- Suspension: Torsion-bar suspension
- Operational range: 270 km (170 mi)
- Maximum speed: 45 km/h (28 mph)

The Landsverk L-60 was a Swedish tank developed in 1934. It was developed by AB Landsverk as a light tank which included several advanced design features such as torsion bar suspension, periscopes rather than view slits and all-welded construction.

The L-60 was progressively improved with several turrets, engines and guns offered by Landsverk. The L-60 entered the international market in 1935 and was eventually adopted by the Swedish army in 4 main variants: Stridsvagn (Strv) m/38, Stridsvagn m/39, Stridsvagn m/40L and Stridsvagn m/40K.

== Variants ==
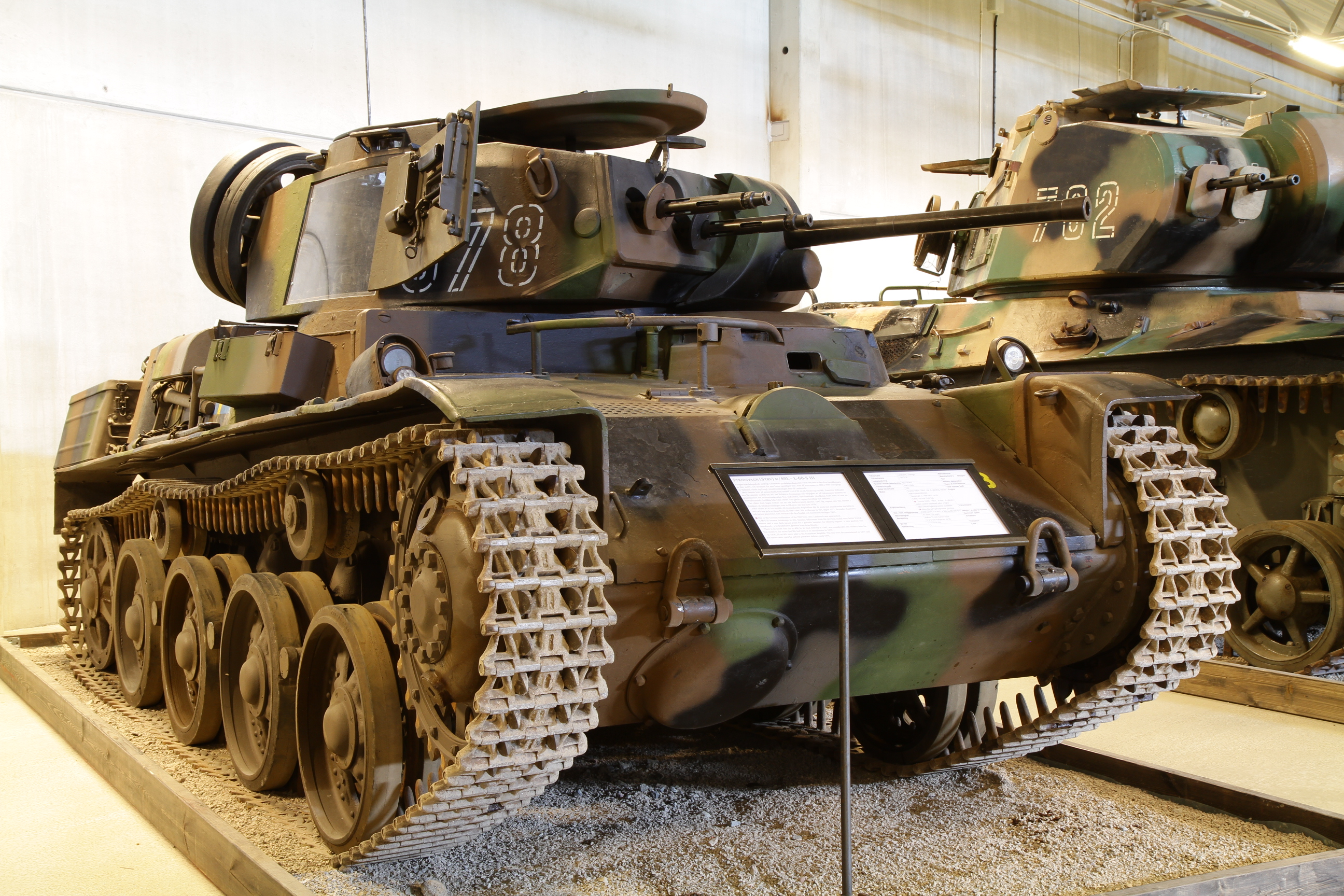
Stridsvagn m40K

- L-60 - First variant produced and delivered to:
  - Ireland - 2 ordered in 1935
- L-60 Ö (for Österreich "Austria") - Variant for the Austrian Army and delivered to:
  - Austria - 1 prototype ordered in 1936 and delivered on January 18th 1938. Similar to the regular L-60 with a 20 mm madsen in the turret but with a raised idler-wheel. Introduction in Austrian Army reduntant due to annexation by Germany.
  - Hungary - received L-60 Ö repurposed and delivered to Hungary together with a Landsverk L-62. The idler-wheel was modified back to the state of a regular L-60. Led to Hungary purchasing a license for the L-60. The Hungarians developed their Toldi tanks from the L-60. The Toldi tanks were used extensively by the Hungarians in World War II. The Hungarians did not use the L-60 itself in combat.
  - k.hk. C40 (Toldi III) - 12 made. Improved Toldi IIa with thicker armour and schürzen plates.
- L-60 S: Variant for the Swedish Army.
  - L-60 S/I (Strv m/38) - 15 ordered in 1937 and delivered in 1939. Armed with a 37 mm m/38 Bofors gun.
  - L-60 S/II (Strv m/39) - 20 ordered in 1939 and delivered in 1940. Armed with a 37 mm m/38 Bofors gun.
  - L-60 S/III (Strv m/40L) - 100 ordered in 1940 and delivered in 1941. Armed with a 37 mm m/38 Bofors gun.
  - L-60 S/IV - Not a direct variant of the L-60. It went under the name Landsverk Terro and was a smaller Landsverk Lago.
  - L-60 S/V (Strv m/40K) - 80 ordered in 1942 and delivered in 1944 by Karlstads Mekaniska Verkstad (Karlstad Mechanical Engineering), a subcontractor that assembled the tanks. Armed with a 37 mm m/38 Bofors gun, armour up to 50 mm.
- Lvkv fm/43 - A.K.A. Luftvärnskanonvagn L-62. Anti-aircraft version armed with dual 40 mm guns.
- L-60-S with 7.5 cm kan m/02 - 1942 prototype assault gun. Also fitted with the 7.5cm Kannon m/40. Armor protection was deemed insufficient so the superstructure was moved to a Stridsvagn m/41 chassis.
- 15 cm Stormpjäs fm/43 - Another assault gun prototype. L-60-S fitted with a 15cm recoilless rifle in 1943. Could fire a 34 kg HE shell at 305 m/s. In 1944 the superstructure was fitted to the Strv m/41 chassis.
- Pvkv IV “Värjan” - 1952 prototype attempt to upgun the L-60. Rejected in favor of a different conversion based on the Strv m/41 chassis.

== Foreign service ==
=== Hungarian service ===
The L-60 was licensed by the Hungarian Weiss Manfréd company for the Hungarian army. It was used as the basis for the Hungarian Toldi tanks which used different guns and were further developed, improved and up-armoured.

=== Irish Service ===
The first Irish Landsverk L-60 was delivered in 1935 and joined Ireland's only other tank a Vickers Mk. D in the 2nd Armoured Squadron. The second Landsverk L-60 arrived in 1936. The L-60s were still in use up until the late 1960s. One L-60 is preserved in running order and the other is in the National Museum of Ireland, Collins Barracks, Dublin.

=== Dominican service ===
Twenty were sold to the Dominican Republic army in 1956, having been refurbished and designated L/60L. In the Dominican Civil War in April 1965, these tanks saw use by Constitutionalist troops against invading American forces during “Operation Power Pack”. Three of the Dominican L/60Ls were destroyed: one by a US Army M40 recoilless rifle team of the 82nd Airborne Division, and the other two respectively by a M50 Ontos and an M48 Patton of a US Marine Corps armor detachment of the 6th MEU. This 29 April 1965 battle was one of the very few tank-vs-tank battles to ever happen in the Americas. After “Power Pack” ended, the United States assisted the Dominican Republic in rebuilding its army and twelve of the original twenty L/60Ls were again refurbished and restored to service. These dozen continued in frontline use until 2002. Today one is preserved in excellent, drivable condition as a historical icon by the Dominican Republic army.

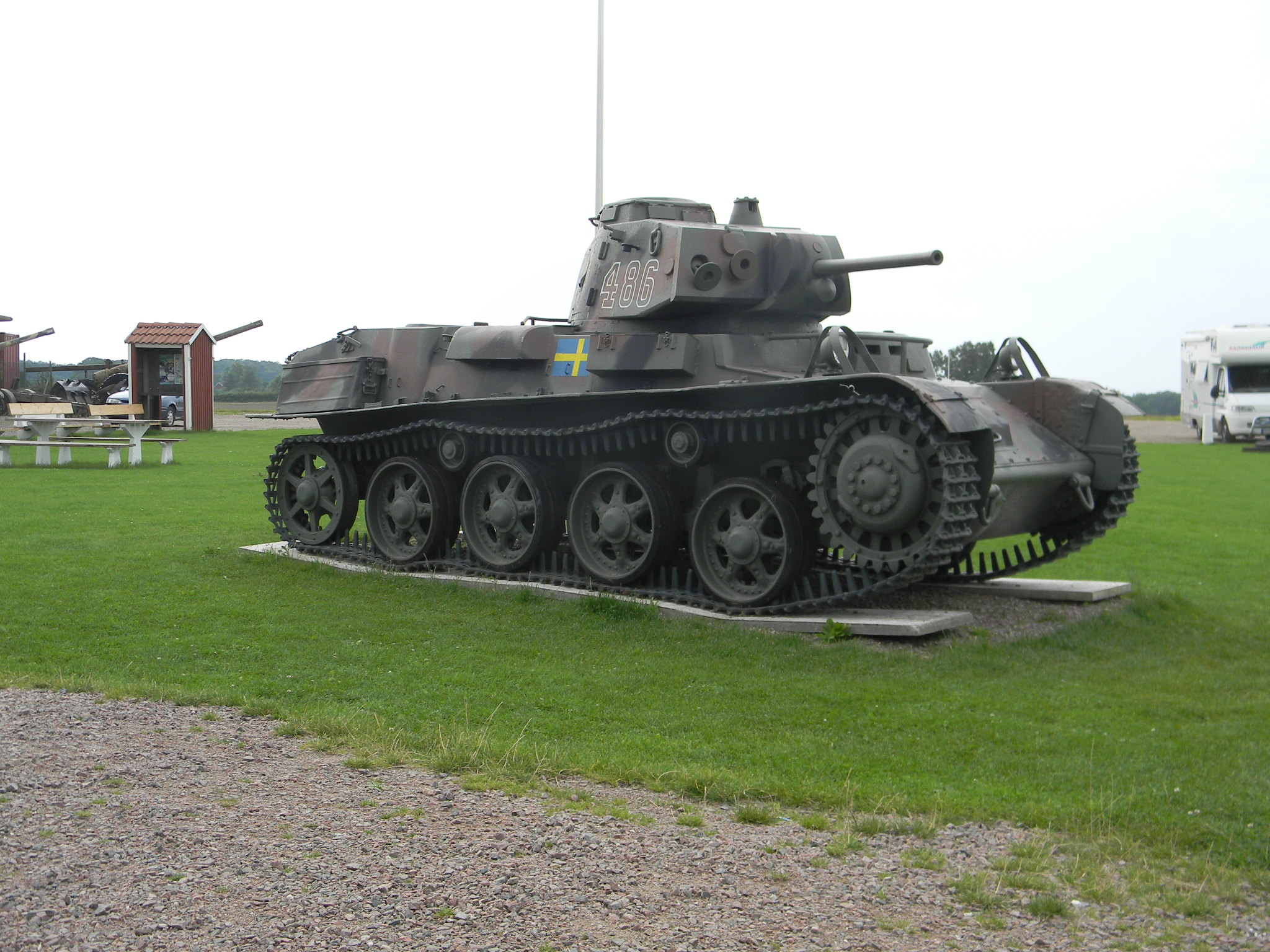
Stridsvagn m/40 at Beredskapsmuseet outside Helsingborg

=== Planned Romanian acquisition ===
In spring of 1936, an offer by the General Technical Inspectorate of the Romanian Army was sent to Swedish engineer Herbert Wiessner, for the purchase of Landsverk tanks. The offer never materialized.

== Sources ==
- Tanks of the World 1915-1945 by Peter Chamberlain and Chris Ellis 1972/2002 p 159.
- Moșneagu, Marian [in Romanian]; Boțoghină, Iulian-Stelian; Manolescu, Mariana-Daniela; Stoica, Leontin-Vasile; Șoitariu, Mihai-Cosmin (2012). Armata română și evoluția armei tancuri. Documente (1919–1945) [The Romanian Army and the Evolution of the Tank Weapon. Documents (1919–1945)] (PDF) (in Romanian). Pitești, Romania: Editura Universității de Stat din Pitești. ISBN 978-606-560-252-6. Archived from the original (PDF) on 19 January 2021.
