= 15,5 cm bandkanon 1 =

Swedish 155 mm self-propelled howitzer

15,5 cm bandkanon 1 Bofors VK 155 L/50
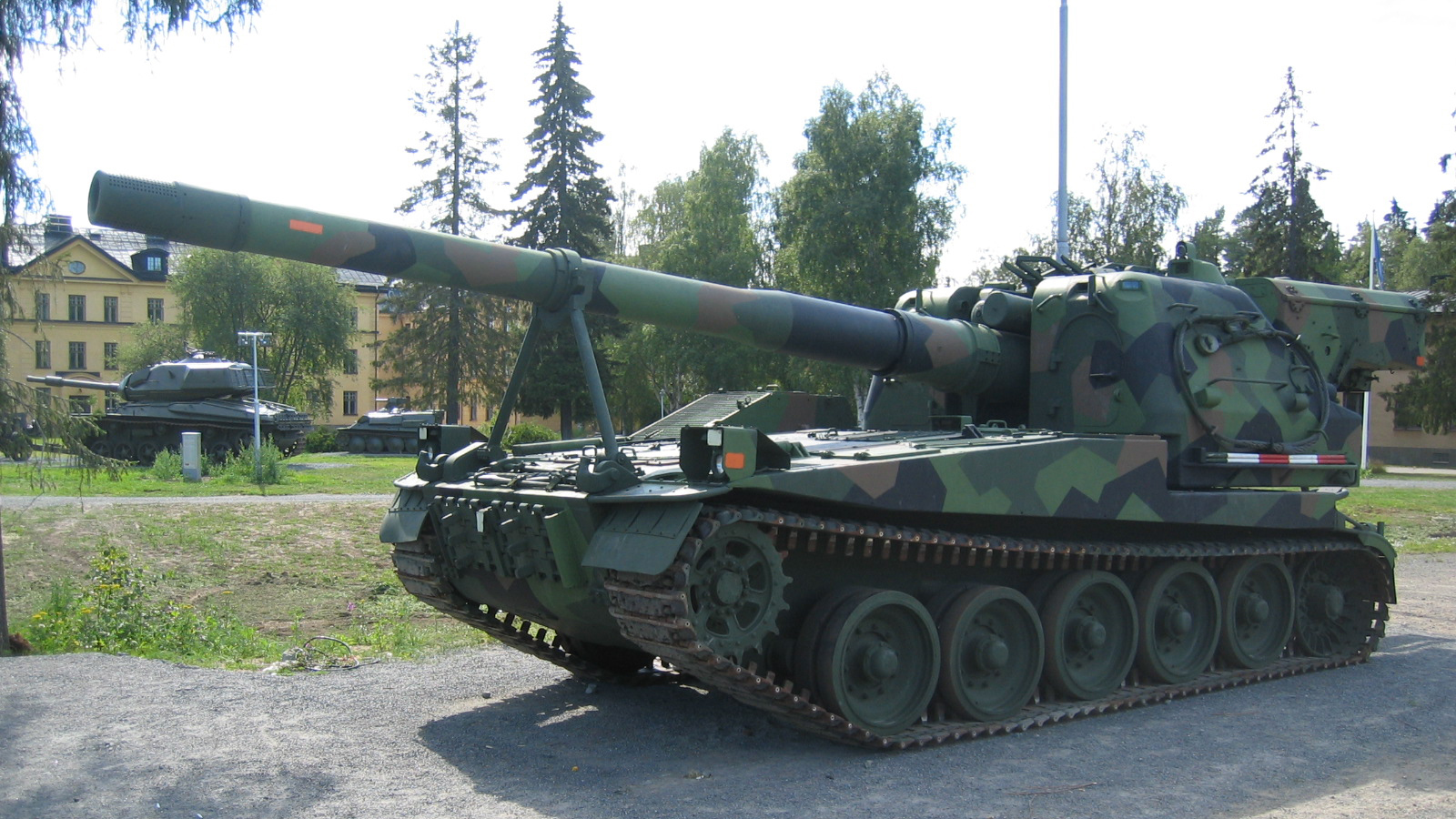
- Bkan 1C at the military history museum in Boden.
- Type: Self-propelled artillery
- Place of origin: Sweden

Service history
- In service: 1967–2003

Production history
- Designer: Bofors
- No. built: 26
- Variants: 1A, 1C

Specifications
- Mass: 52 tonnes (114,639 lbs) (bkan 1A); 53 tonnes (116,843 lbs) (bkan 1C)
- Length: 6.55 m (21 ft 6 in); 11 m (36 ft 1 in)including gun
- Width: 3.37 m (11 ft 1 in)
- Height: 3.55 m (11 ft 8 in); 3.85 m (12 ft 8 in) including AAMG
- Crew: 5
- Armor: 20 mm (.78 in) maximum
- Main armament: 155 mm kanon m/60
- Secondary armament: 7.62 mm ksp 58
- Engine: Diesel: Rolls-Royce K60; 240 hp (180 kW) (bkan 1A); Detroit 6V-53T; 290 hp (220 kW) (bkan 1C ); Gas turbine: Boeing 502-10MA; 300 hp (220 kW) (both)
- Power/weight: 10.38 hp/tonne (bkan 1A); 11.13 hp/tonne (bkan 1C)
- Suspension: hydro-pneumatic
- Operational range: 230 km (143 mi)
- Maximum speed: 35 km/h (22 mph)

15,5 cm bandkanon 1 (15,5 cm bkan 1, pronounced "b-kan"), meaning "15.5 cm (6.1 in) tracked cannon 1", was a Swedish self-propelled artillery vehicle in use with the Swedish Army from 1967 to 2003, developed by Aktiebolaget Bofors. Its product name was Bofors Vagnkanon 155 mm L/50 (VK 155 L/50), meaning roughly "Tracked Automotive Gun 155 mm L/50" (literal translation: "Wagon Cannon 155 mm L/50"). Bkan 1 was one of the world's heaviest and most powerful (in terms of volume of fire) self-propelled artillery vehicles in use during its service.

It had a 155 mm autocannon with an exceptionally high rate of fire, being able to fire 15 shells in 45 seconds with one round preloaded and full magazine of two rows of seven rounds in a clip. The magazine could then be reloaded with a built-in hoist in about 2 minutes.

Each shell had a weight of 47 kg and a tactical range of 28 km.

Its chassis was based on a lengthened Stridsvagn 103 with one extra road wheel. The first variant, the Bkan 1A, used the same engine as the first Strv 103's and was thus somewhat underpowered since that engine was designed to drive a 30-ton tank, while the Bkan 1 weighed over 50 tons. Despite this, its mobility was more than adequate for its role as an artillery piece.

== Use ==
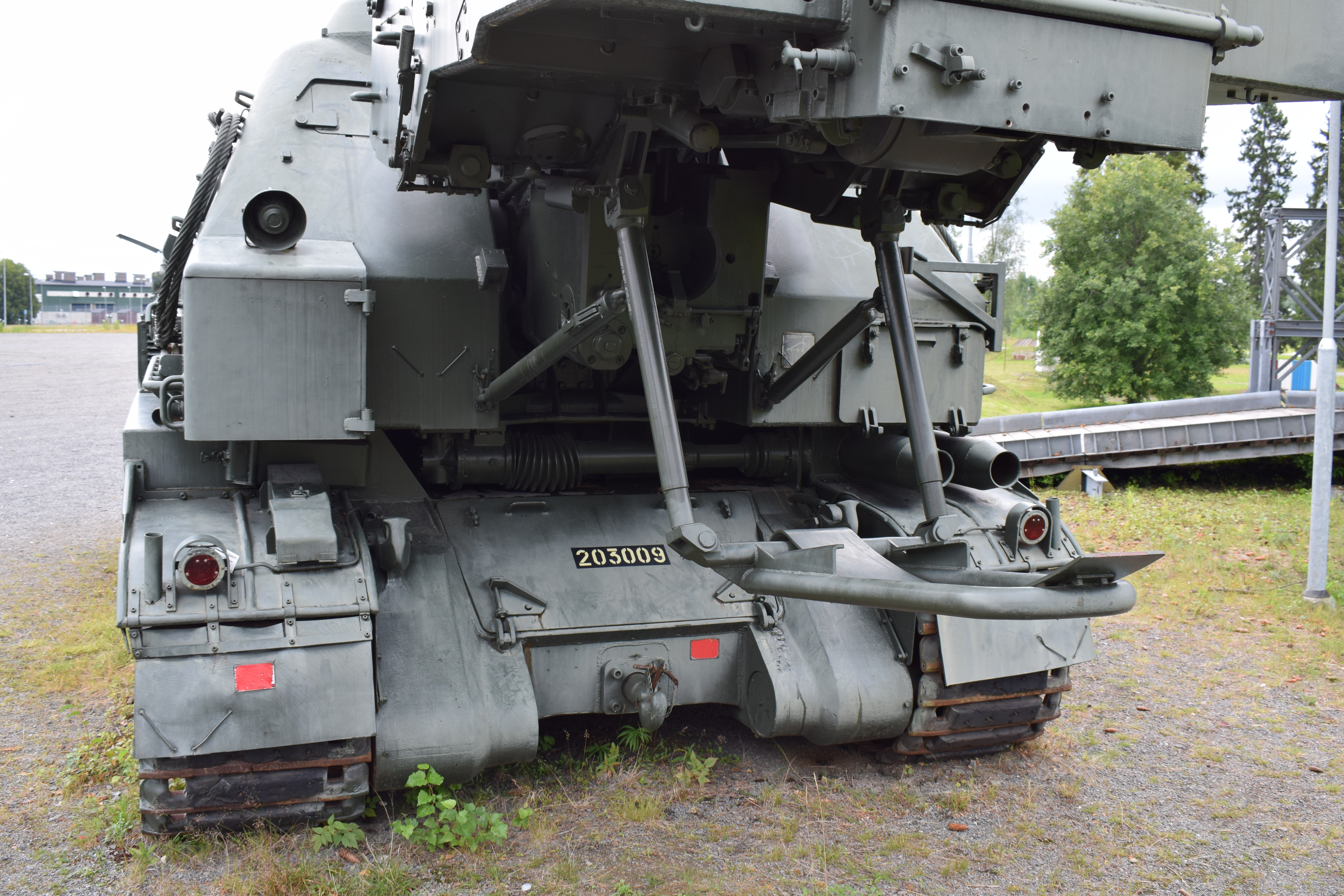
Closeup of the autoloader

The plan was to produce about 70 vehicles, but due to defence budget cuts only 26 bandkanon 1s were manufactured. They were used as divisional artillery in Norrland, used by Boden Artillery Regiment and later Norrbotten Regiment. They were organized in three battalions of 8 vehicles each until the late 1980s and after that, two battalions of 12 vehicles each until the bandkanon 1 was retired in 2003.

== History ==
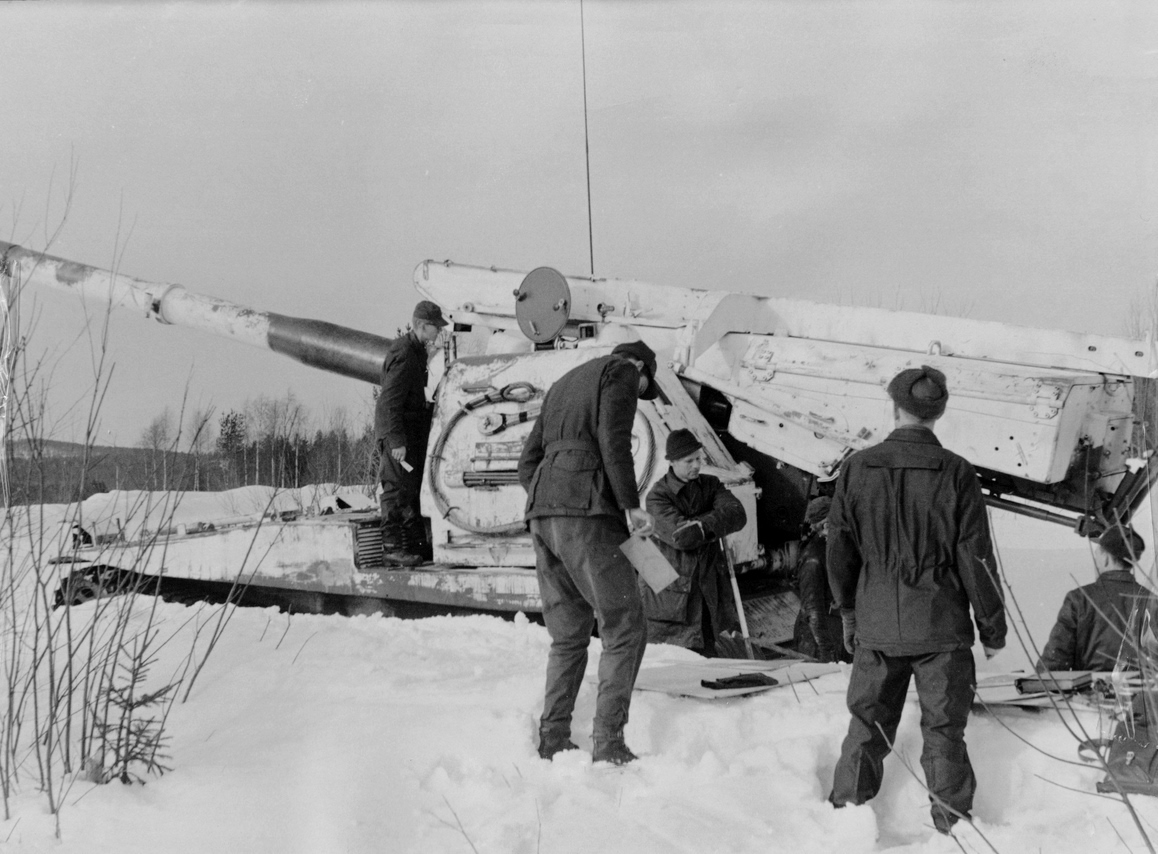
A Bandkanon being used as a stationary battery.

Development of what would become the bkan 1 started at the end of the 1940s, but it was not until the 1950s when development accelerated. When the KRV tank project was cancelled it was decided that one of the prototype chassis (developed by AB Landsverk) was to be repurposed as the prototype of the new self-propelled gun under the designation Artillerikanonvagn 151 (Akv 151), translating to "Artillery cannon wagon 151", the number 151 meaning 1st vehicle with a gun in the 15 cm caliber category. The chassis was reversed so the rear became the new front and an oscillating gun turret constructed by AB Bofors was fitted at the back (prior front). As the concept seemed promising, the self-propelled gun was re-designed by Landsverk under supervision of the Royal Swedish Army Materiel Administration to use the same drive train as the S-tank to speed up production. Bandkanon 1 appeared in two versions; the original version was Bandkanon 1 (later designated Bandkanon 1A).

After modification done to the vehicle during the 1980s, the new version was designated Bandkanon 1C. The main difference was the introduction of a drive train more similar to the one introduced on the new "C" version of Stridsvagn 103; other modifications were the removal of the built-in ammunition crane in order to save weight and the introduction of the POS 2 system for navigation, positioning, and directing.

=== Atomic cannon ===
Persistent rumours claiming that the Bandkanon 1 was intended to fire nuclear shells can be readily dismissed. The USA had already in 1959–1960 made clear that export of the W48 shell, the only 155 mm with a nuclear warhead produced, was out of the question. The Swedish nuclear weapons program quickly concluded that the amount of plutonium available was the limiting factor, and smaller low yield ordnance used as much as the larger aircraft bombs that were the priority for the program. The high level army exercises done in the 1960s did not include any plans for own use of tactical nuclear weapons. Finally, the exceptionally high rate of fire of the Bkan 1 would, if not being directly detrimental, serve little to no purpose when equipped with atomic weapons. This trait on the other hand goes well with the claim that Bkan 1 was to seal off the routes of attack in the north of Sweden near the Finnish border using chemical weapons.
