= Ksp 58 =

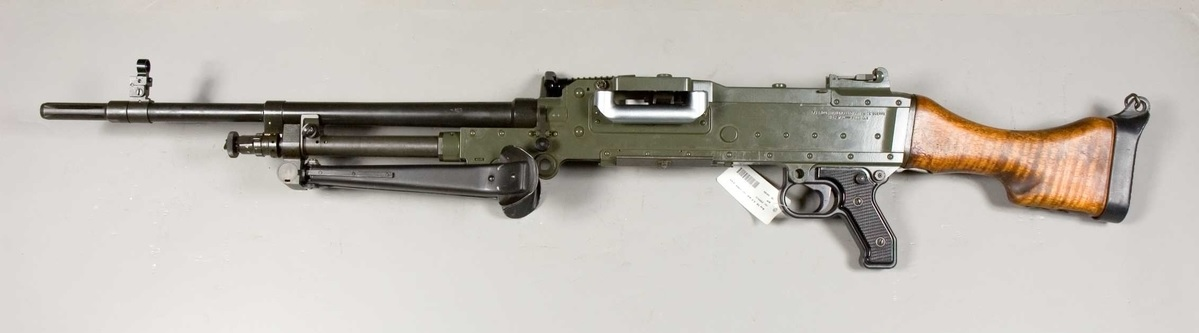
- A Ksp 58 in the Swedish Army Museum
- Type: General-purpose machine gun
- Place of origin: Belgium; Sweden

Service history
- In service: 1958–present
- Used by: Swedish Armed Forces
- Wars: War in Afghanistan; Russian Invasion of Ukraine

Production history
- Designer: Ernest Vervier
- Designed: 1950s
- Manufacturer: FN Herstal; Carl Gustafs stads gevärsfaktori
- Produced: 1958–present

Specifications
- Mass: 11.79 kg (26.0 lb)
- Length: 1,263 mm (49.7 in)
- Barrel length: 630 mm (25 in)
- Width: 118.7 mm (4.67 in)
- Height: 263 mm (10.4 in)
- Cartridge: 6.5×55mm Swedish; 7.62×51mm NATO
- Action: Gas-operated, open bolt
- Rate of fire: 650–1,000 rounds/min
- Muzzle velocity: 840 metres per second (2,800 ft/s)
- Effective firing range: 800 m
- Maximum firing range: 1,800 m from tripod
- Feed system: Non-disintegrating DM1 or disintegrating M13 linked belt
- Sights: Folding leaf sight with aperture and notch, front blade

The Ksp 58 (Swedish: Kulspruta 58, English: Machine Gun 58) is a Swedish variant of the Belgian FN MAG general-purpose machine gun, adopted by the Swedish Armed Forces in 1958.

== History ==
After 1945, many countries were trying to produce their own machine guns based on the MG 42 design. In the early 1950s, Belgian arms manufacturer FN Herstal succeeded in developing a general-purpose machine gun called the MAG. The initial Ksp 58A version used by Sweden was chambered for 6.5×55mm, while the B and later models were chambered for 7.62×51mm NATO.

== Users ==
- Estonia: Ksp 58B version in use. Was first received from Sweden in 1990's as military aid.
- Latvia: Ksp 58B version in use. Was first received from Sweden in 1990's as military aid.
- Lithuania: Ksp 58B version in use. Was first received from Sweden in 1990's as military aid.
- Sweden: Used by the Swedish Armed Forces since 1958 to the present.
- Ukraine: Ksp 58B version in use. Received as military aid
