= Kulspruta m/39 =

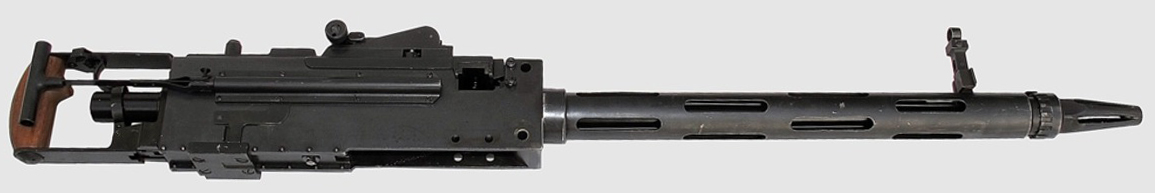
- Type: Machine gun
- Place of origin: Sweden

Service history
- In service: 1939-present
- Used by: Sweden

Production history
- Designer: John Moses Browning
- Designed: 1942
- Manufacturer: Carl Gustafs Stads Gevärsfaktori
- Produced: 1937-1944
- No. built: ≈7600 pieces

Specifications
- Cartridge: 6.5×55mm 8×63mm patron m/32 7.62×51mm NATO
- Action: Recoil
- Rate of fire: 600-720 rounds per minute
- Maximum firing range: 1800 to 2400 m
- Feed system: Belt
- Sights: Iron

The Kulspruta m/39 (ksp m/39) is a Swedish development of the Browning M1917 machine gun. It is an air-cooled variant of the Kulspruta m/36. While primarily mounted on vehicles, it could also be used as an anti-aircraft weapon, with the latter mainly being chambered in 8mm (8 x 63 mm m/32). After World War II, the 6.5 models were adapted to fire the 6.5x55 m/41 cartridge (6,5mm sk ptr m/94 prj m/41). In the 1970s the machine guns were converted to 7.62×51mm NATO. Ksp M/39s were still in use on the Stridsvagn 122 and Combat Vehicle 90, but were later replaced with more modern machine guns.
