= Military Technical Museum Lešany =

The Military Technical Museum Lešany
- Vojenské technické muzeum Lešany
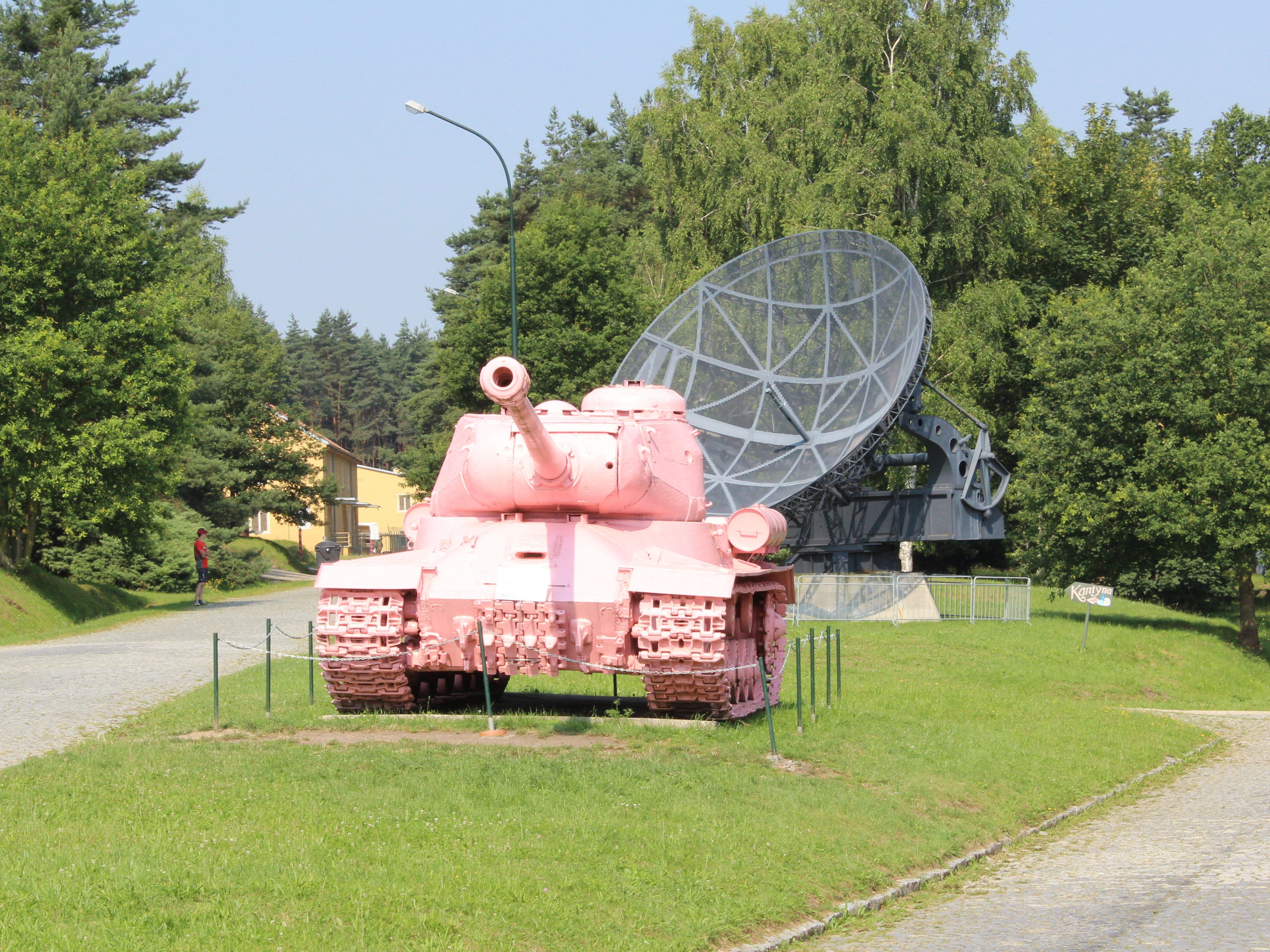
- The famous Pink Tank IS-2 at the entrance to the museum

- Location of the museum within the Czech Republic
- Established: 1996
- Location: Lešany, Central Bohemian Region, Czech Republic
- Coordinates: 49.855°N 14.544°E
- Type: Military museum
- Owner: Military History Institute Prague
- Public transit access: Krhanice train station
- Parking: On site (no charge)
- Website: www.vhu.cz

Military Technical Museum Lešany (Czech: Vojenské technické muzeum Lešany) is a museum of military vehicles in Lešany in the Central Bohemian Region of the Czech Republic. It is part of the Military History Institute Prague together with Kbely Aviation Museum and Army Museum Žižkov. Its exposition contains over 700 historic tanks, cannons, motorcycles, armored vehicles, trucks, military passenger vehicles, missile systems and other military equipment manufactured from 1890 to the present. The museum is open from June to September on weekends and in July and August all days except Mondays and is free of charge.

== History and presentation ==
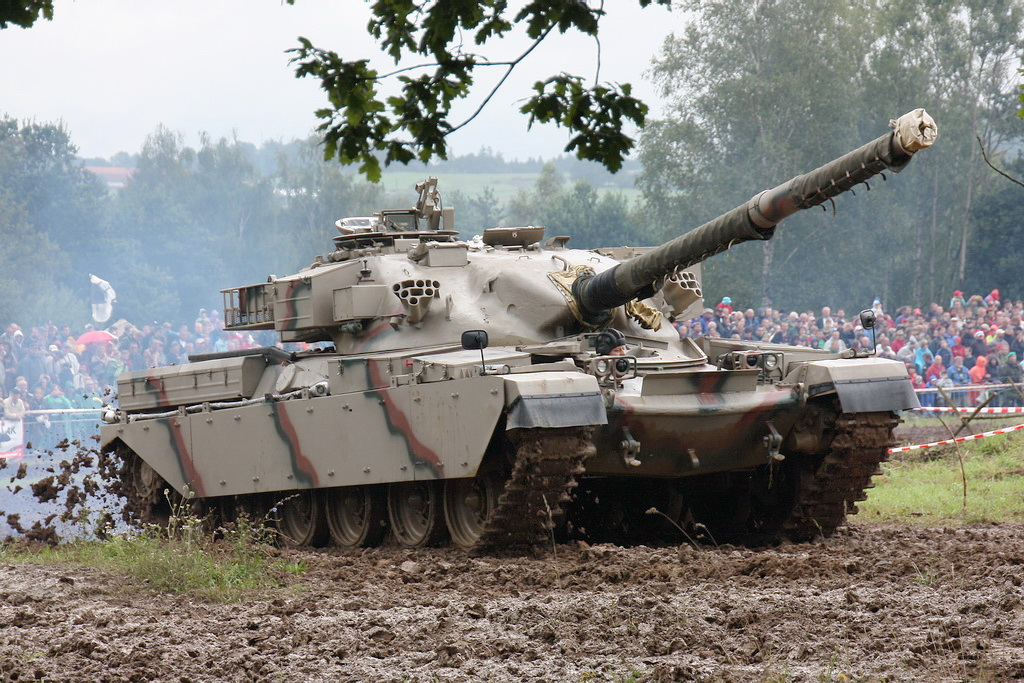
A former Jordanian Chieftain tank during 8th 'Tank Day' at the dynamic display arena

The museum was established in 1996 in a former artillery barracks in the municipality of Lešany, near Týnec nad Sázavou. The collections are presented in ten halls, six roofed areas and also in the open air. The exposition is presented in themed manner like separate Artillery hall with Škoda cannons and howitzers, pre WWII Czechoslovak Army, WWII North Africa theme, Czechoslovat signal corps theme hall or Czechoslovak Army missiles presented in separate hall. Since 2003, a so-called "Tank Day" is held every year at the end of the summer season (usually last Saturday of summer vacation) in the area of the museum, where many of the tanks and other military vehicles from the museum's collection are presented in dynamic displays. The presentations also include vehicles from military car clubs and clubs of military history from Czechia. The Army of the Czech Republic also participates in these events, therefore current military equipment of the Czech Army can also be seen on display. There are also events at the beginning of every season (in May) which are usually dedicated to other branches of ground equipment, like "Artillery day", "AAA day", "Tatra day", etc. or to anniversaries of the Army of Czech Republic. Since 2021 the museum also have part of the Berlin wall as part of the exhibition.

== The collection ==
The following list does not represent the complete museum's collection, it is a list of the most important vehicles and weapons, some of which may be located in a depository that is not accessible to the public.

WWI and the interwar period

Praga V, Fiat 18 BLR, Nash Quad, MU-4 tankette, Praga RV, Tatra 27

World War II: Axis

Panzer 35(t), Panzer 38(t), Panzer IV, StuG III, Hetzer, Krupp Protze, HORCH 108, VW type 82 Kübelwagen, Volkswagen Schwimmwagen, Steyr 1500 A, Stoewer R 200, Tempo G1200, SPA TL 37, Sd.Kfz. 2 Kettenkrad, BMW R-35, 15cm Nebelwerfer 41, LG 42, Tatra 111, Tatra 57K, Škoda 956, 8.8 cm FlaK, 3.7 cm Flak 36, 2 cm FlaK 38, 7.5 cm Pak 97/38, 15 cm sFH 18, 10.5 cm leFH 18, Würzburg-Riese, Freya radar

World War II: Allies and neutral powers

M4A1 Sherman, M4A3 Sherman, M36, M3A1 Stuart, Cromwell, Comet, T-34/76, T-34/85, IS-2, IS-3, SU-76, SU-100, ISU-152, Praga LTP, Praga LTH, Strv m/37, LVT-4, GMC CCKW 353, Harley-Davidson WLA, Dodge WC-52, Dodge WC-54, Dodge WC-57, M3A1 Scout Car, M16 MGMC, Ford GPW, Humber scout car, Bedford MWC, Universal Carrier, Morris Commercial C8 Quad, Scammell Pioneer SV2S, Austin K6, Bedford QLT, BSA M20, Matchless G3/L, BM-13, BA-64B, GAZ-67B, GAZ-AA, Stalinets S-65, ZiS-3, QF 25 pounder, Sav m/43, Bofors 40 mm gun

Cold War: East

T-54, T-55, PT-76, T-72, 2S1 Gvozdika, 2S4 Tyulpan, 2S7 Pion, 152mm SpGH DANA, ZSU-57-2, M53/59 Praga, BMP-1, BMP-2, OT-62 TOPAS, BTR-60, OT-64 SKOT, OT-65, OT-810, BTR-152, ShM-120 PRAM, BM-21 Grad, RM-51, RM-70, SA-2 Guideline, SA-3 Goa, SA-4 Ganef, SA-5 Gammon, SA-8 Gecko, SA-9 Gaskin, SA-13 Gopher, FROG-3, FROG-7, SS-23 Spider, SS-1c SCUD-B, SS-21 Scarab, 9P148 Konkurs, 9P19 launcher, R-330P, KRTP-86 Tamara, GAZ-46 MAV, Praga V3S, GAZ-69, UAZ-469, ZIL-157, ZIL-131, KrAZ-255, Tatra 805, Tatra 813, Tatra 815

Cold War: West

Centurion, Chieftain, M47 Patton, M48 Patton, M60 Patton, Merkava Mk.I, Leopard 1, AMX-13, Panhard EBR, Alvis Saracen, Ferret Mk.2/3, DAF YA 126, M561 Gama Goat, Unimog S404, DKW Munga, Dodge M37, M151, Bv 202, Vkp m/42, Pbv 301

Modern

T-72M3CZ prototype, HMMWV, Toyota Hilux SCV

== Gallery ==
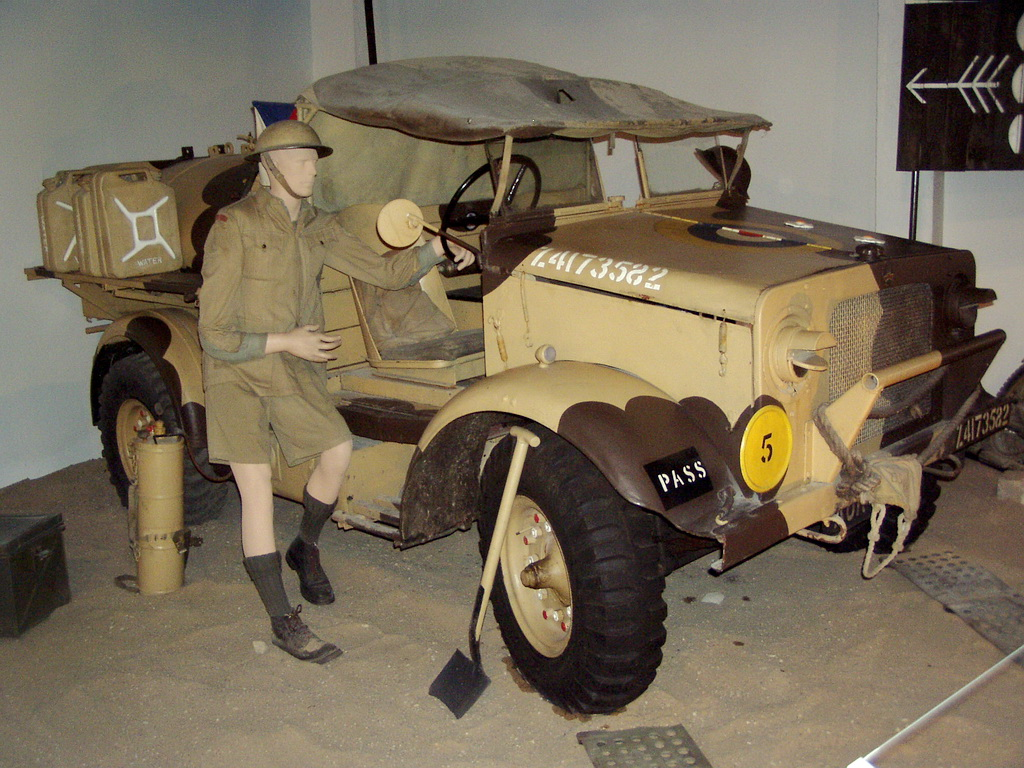
British Bedford MWC water tanker

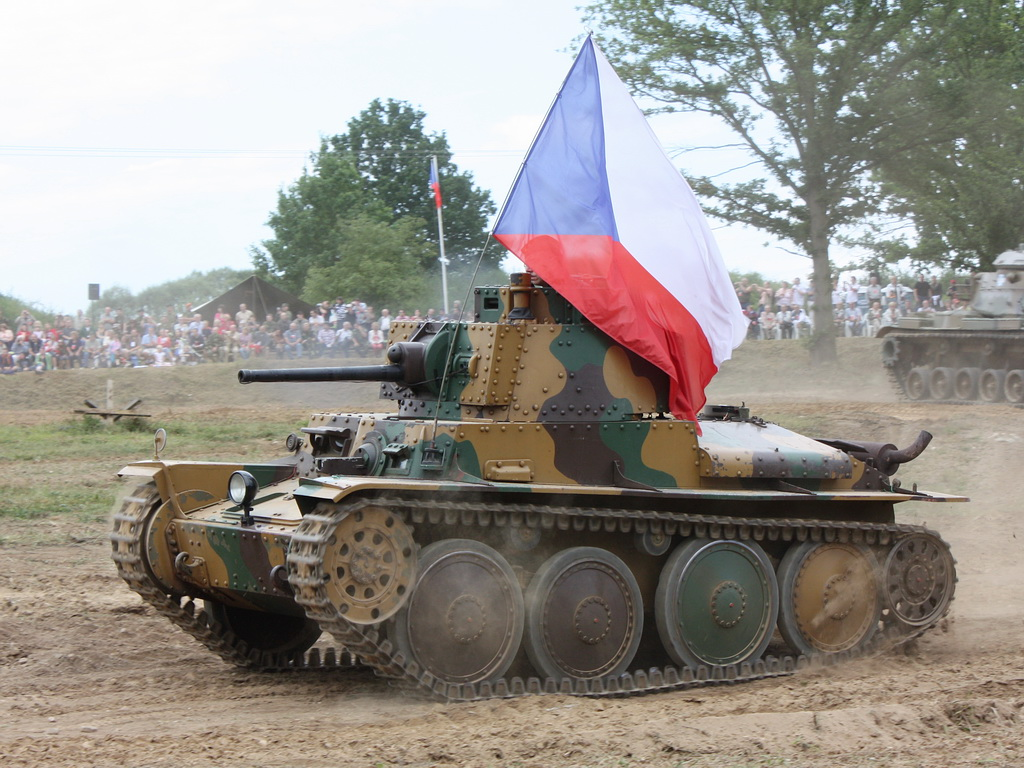
Czechoslovak LT-38 tank

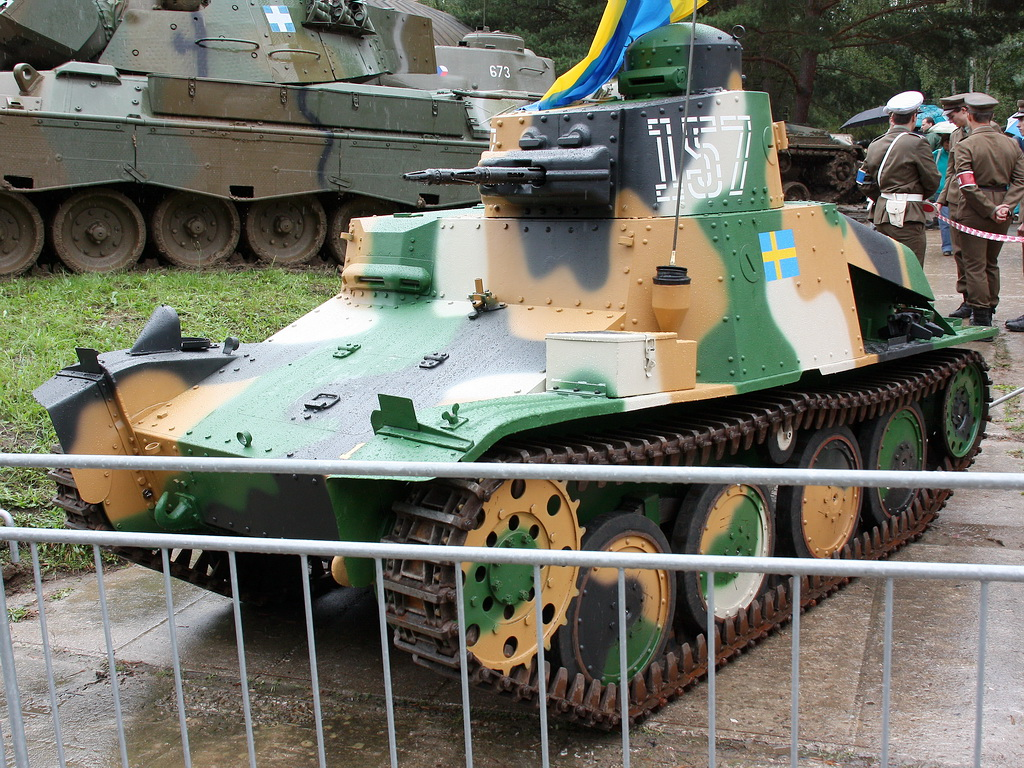
Swedish Strv m/37 tank

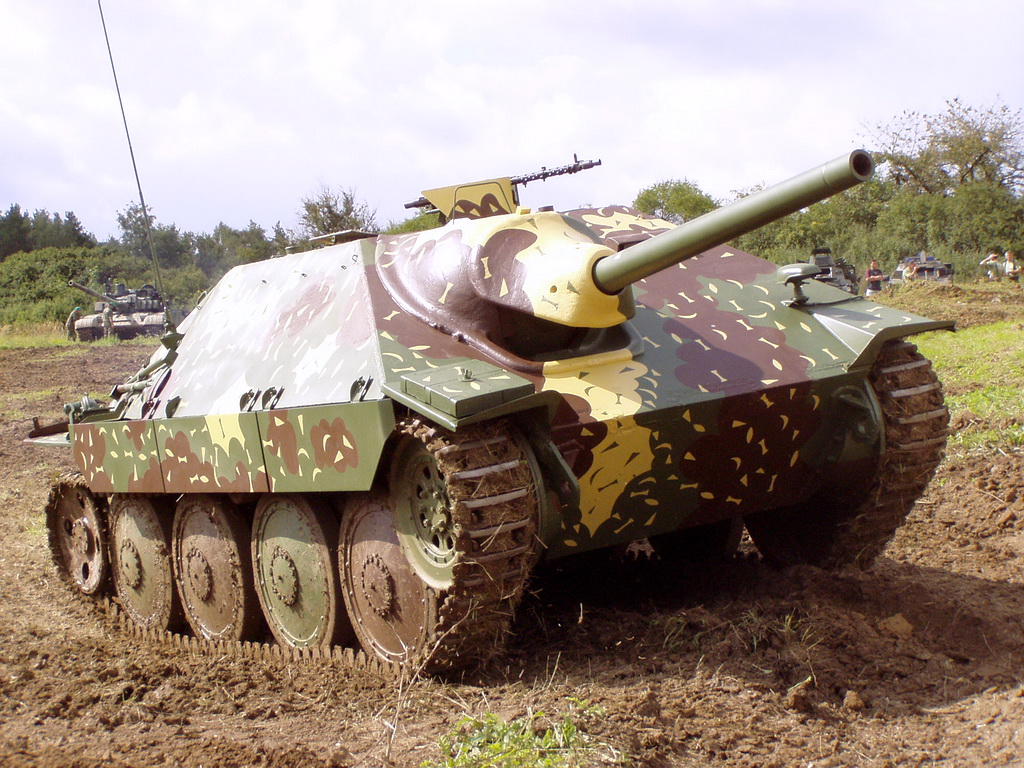
German Jagdpanzer 38(t) tank destroyer

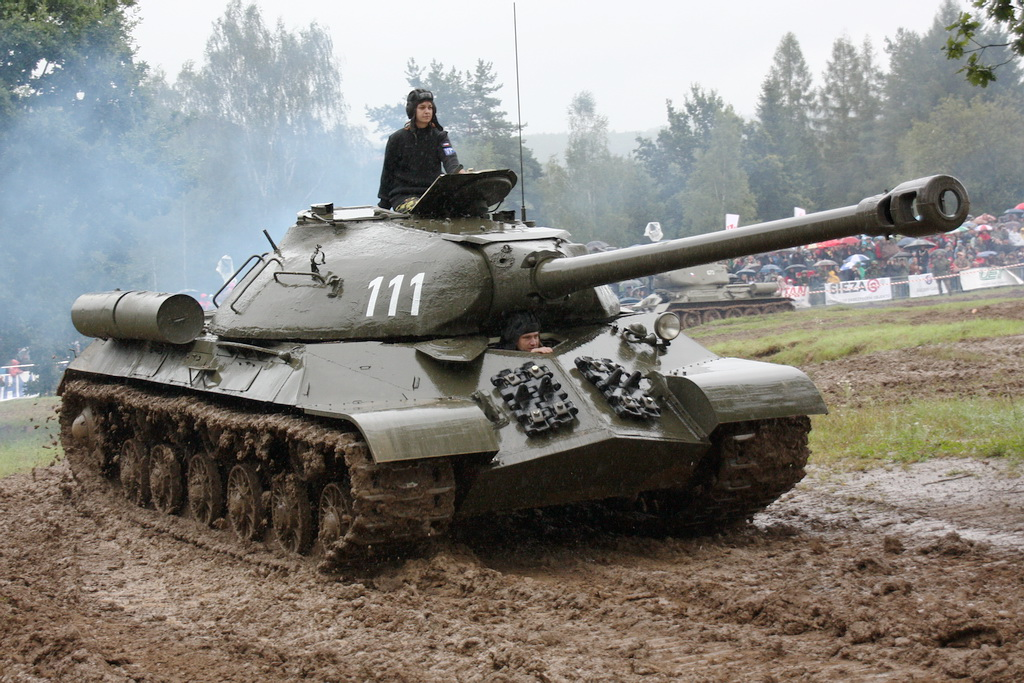
Soviet IS-3 heavy tank

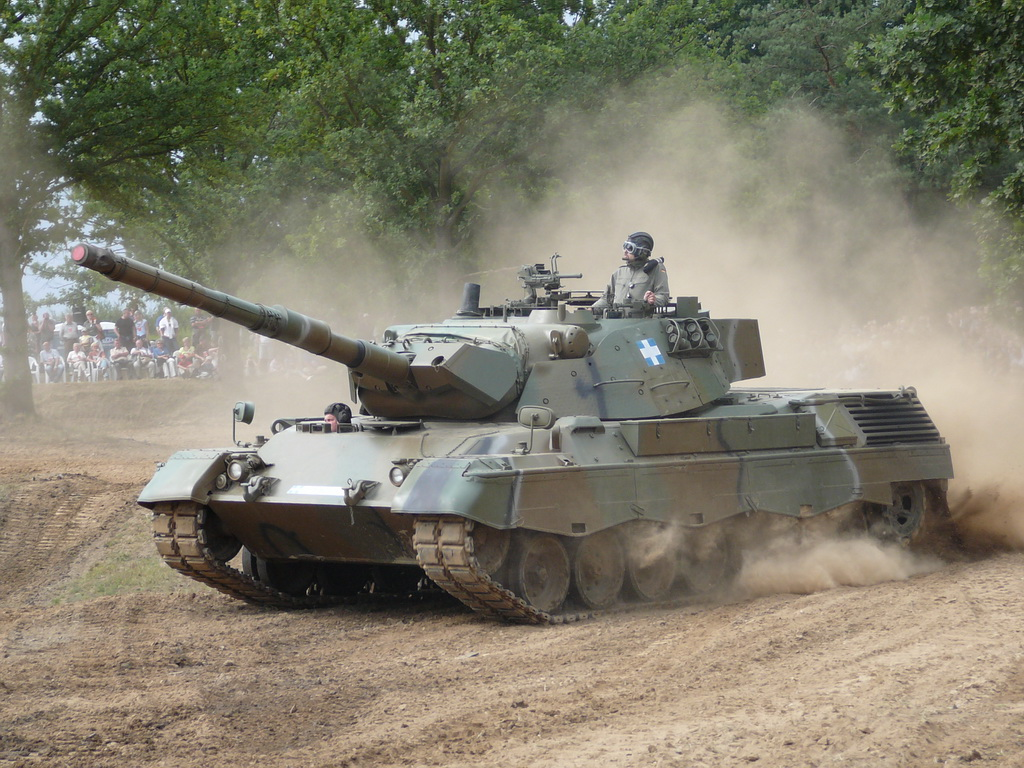
Greek Leopard 1V tank

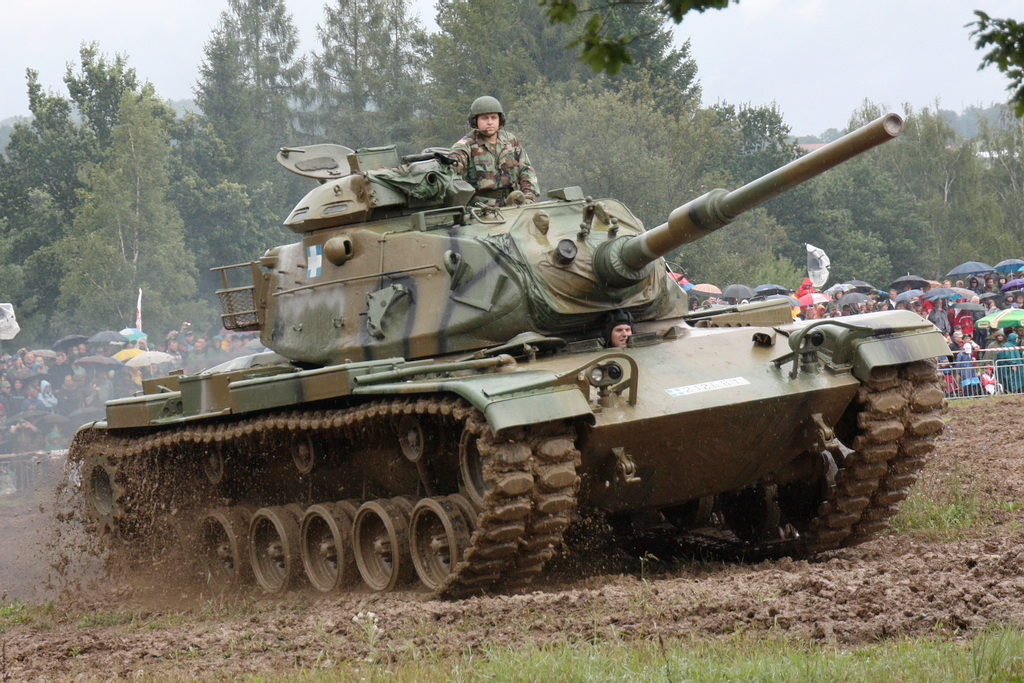
Greek M60A1 Patton tank

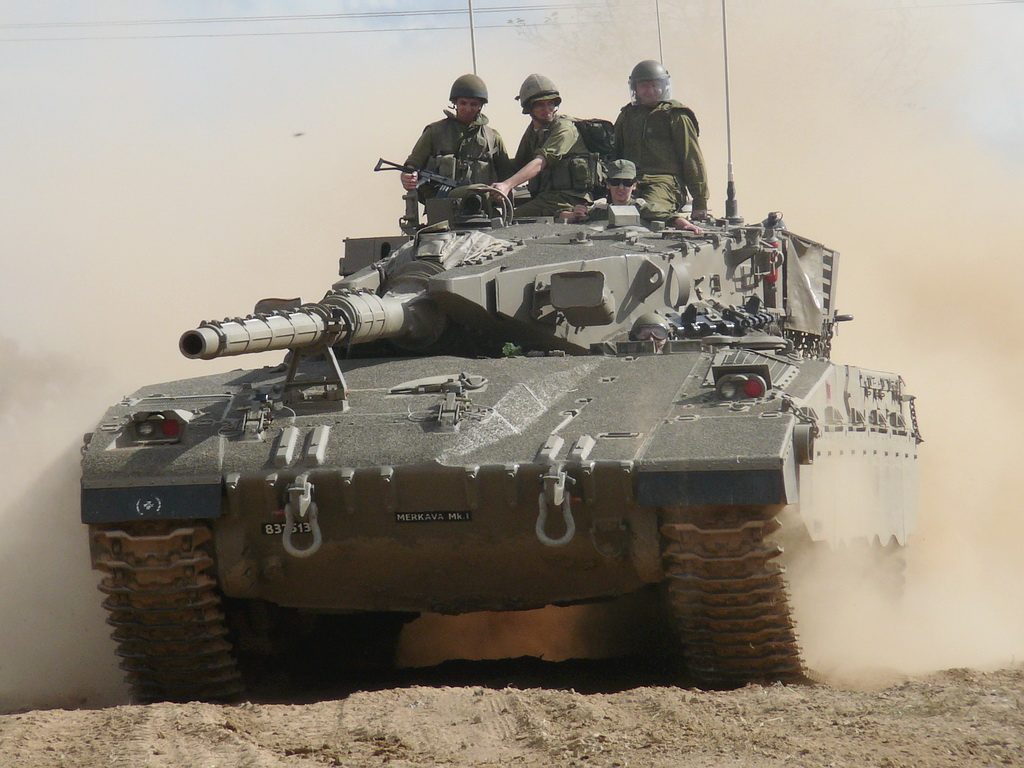
Israeli Merkava Mk.IB tank

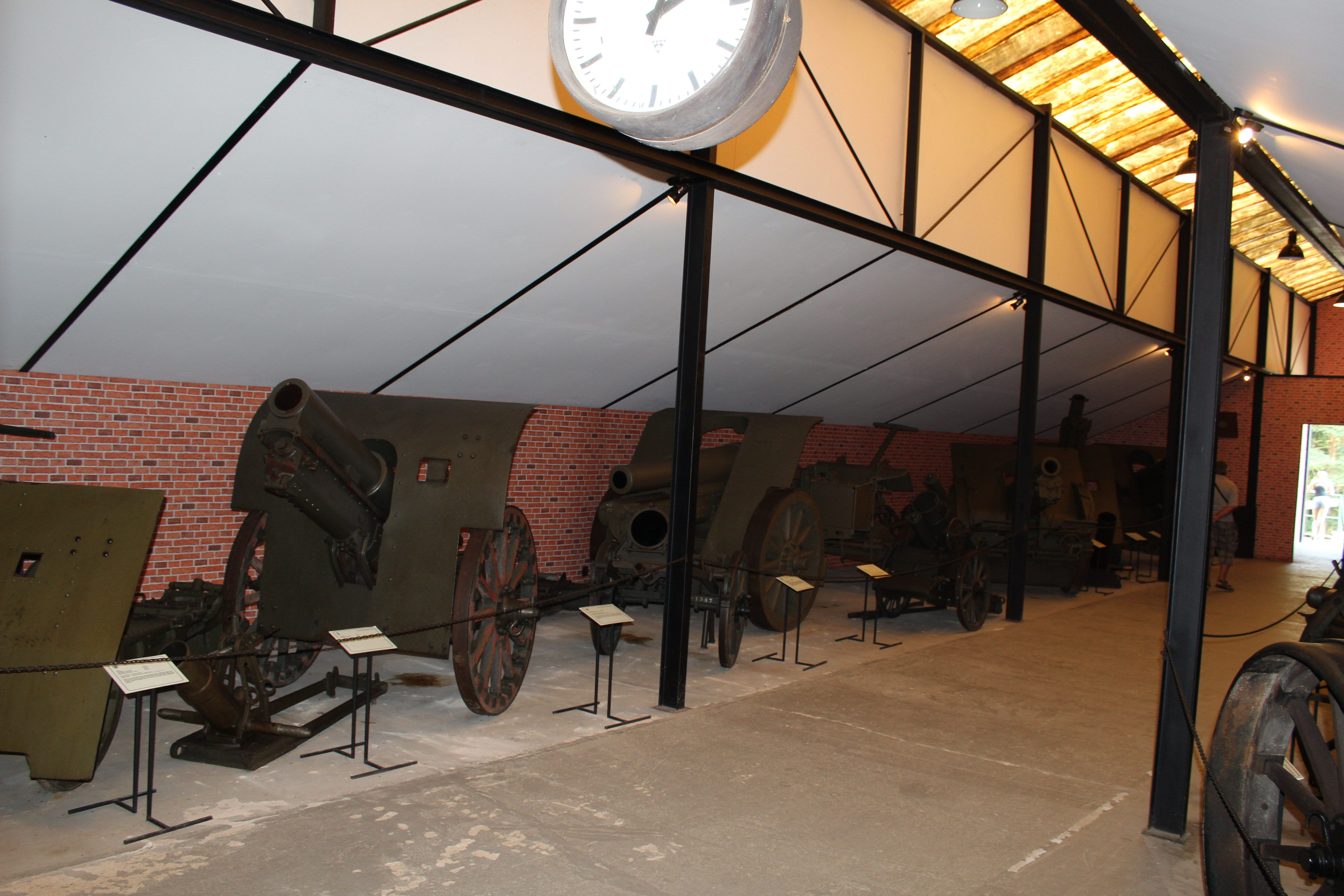
Škoda cannons in Artillery hall

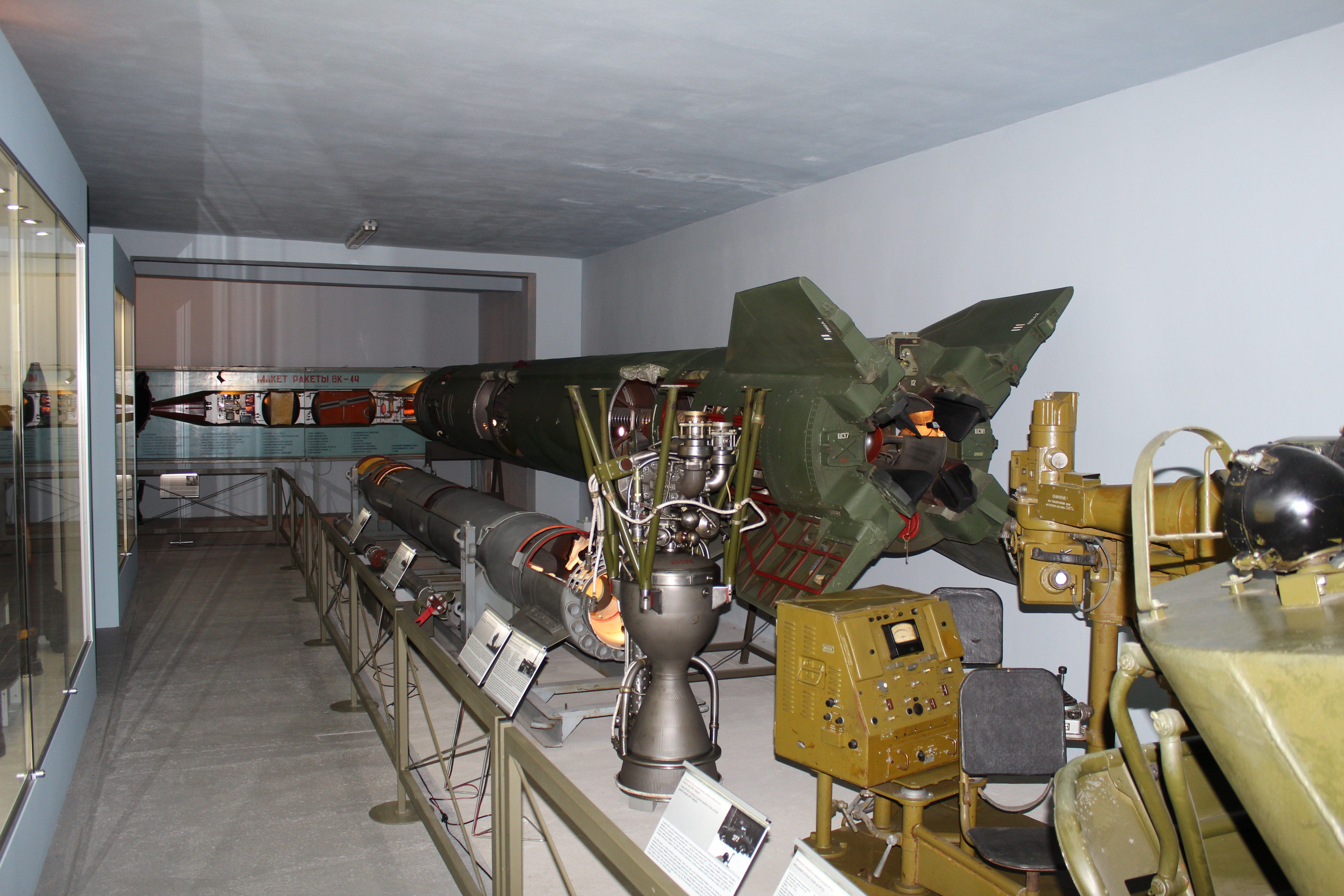
Scud missile in Rocket hall
