= Flakpanzer 38(t) =

German self-propelled anti-aircraft gun

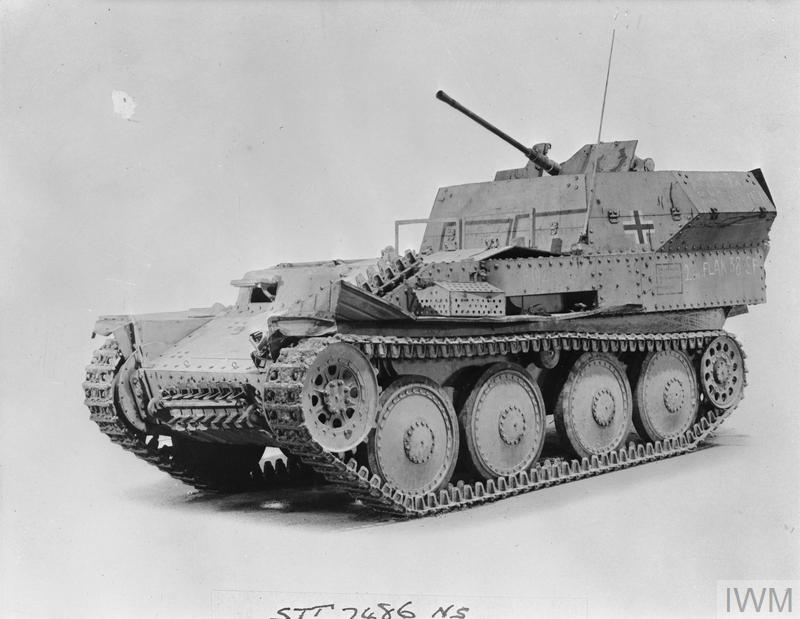
- Type: Self-propelled anti-aircraft gun
- Place of origin: Nazi Germany

Service history
- In service: 1944–1945
- Used by: Nazi Germany
- Wars: World War II

Production history
- Produced: 1943–1944
- No. built: 141

Specifications
- Mass: 9,800 kilograms (21,600 lb)
- Length: 4.61 m (15 ft 1 in)
- Width: 2.15 m (7 ft 1 in)
- Height: 2.25 m (7 ft 5 in)
- Crew: 4
- Armor: 10–15 mm
- Main armament: 1 x 2 cm Flak 38; 1,040 rounds
- Engine: Praga AC 6-cylinder petrol 147 hp (110 kW)
- Power/weight: 15 hp/tonne
- Suspension: Leaf spring
- Operational range: 210 km (130 mi)
- Maximum speed: 42 km/h (26 mph)

The Flakpanzer 38(t), officially named Flakpanzer 38(t) auf Selbstfahrlafette 38(t) Ausf M (Sd.Kfz. 140), was a German self-propelled anti-aircraft gun used in World War II. It is sometimes incorrectly referred to as the Gepard, which may lead to confusion with the unrelated Flakpanzer Gepard.

The Flakpanzer 38(t) was intended to be a temporary solution to air defense whilst the Flakpanzer IV was being developed in 1943.

== Design and development ==
The Flakpanzer 38(t) was designed around the chassis of the LT-38, a pre-war Czech design, which following the German occupation was produced for the Wehrmacht as the Panzer 38(t) until it was no longer effective.

As the vehicle used the Ausf M chassis, the engine was located near the middle of the vehicle, and the armament was placed at the rear in a specially designed armoured section. The superstructure could fold down to allow 360-degree traverse at low elevation.

Including the single prototype, 141 Flakpanzer 38(t)s were built from November 1943 to February 1944, entering service in 1944.

== Combat use ==
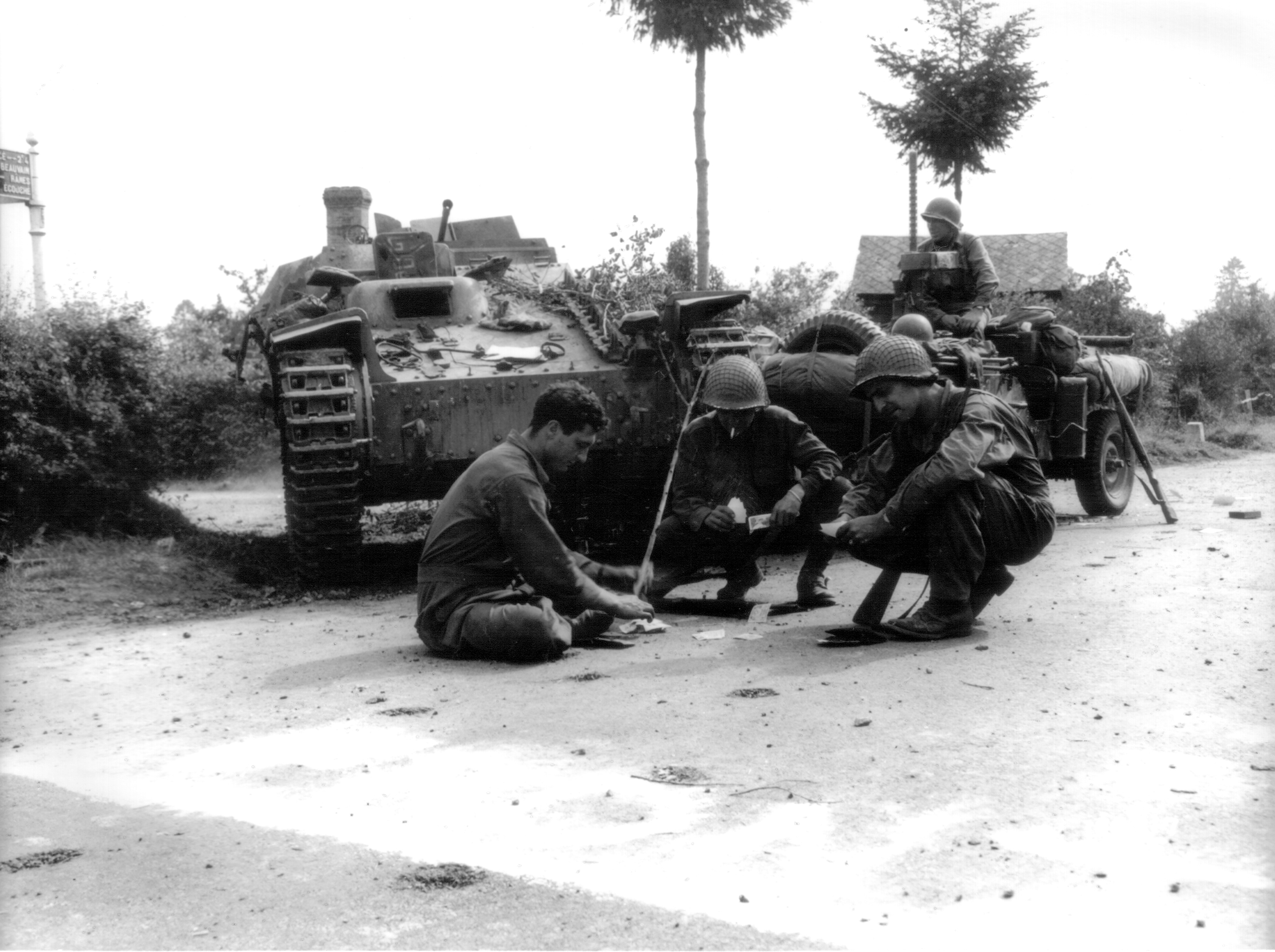
American soldiers playing cards in front of a destroyed Flakpanzer 38(t) in Normandy, 1944.

The Flakpanzer 38(t) was intended to be issued to the anti-aircraft platoon of each tank battalion (Panzer Abteilung) in a Panzer division.

Most of the Flakpanzer 38(t)s were issued to Panzer Divisions on the Western Front, the remainder served on the Eastern Front. An example user being the 12th SS Panzer Division.

At this late stage in the war, the single 2 cm Flak main armament was no longer sufficient to ward off enemy aircraft, and the Flakpanzer 38(t) became easy prey for Allied aircraft. It did prove effective for use against unarmored ground targets.

== Survivors ==
Four complete vehicles exist, having been recovered from a French scrapyard in Trun, Normandy. They went to the following museums.

- Bayeux memorial
- Musee Automobiles de Normandie, Cleres (Now believed to be in private hands in the UK)
- Saumur armour museum
- Becker private collection

== See also ==
- Sd.Kfz. 138/1 Grille - German self-propelled gun on similar chassis
- Panzer 38(t) - the chassis the Flakpanzer 38(t) was based on

== Bibliography ==
- Chamberlain, Peter; Hilary L. Doyle (1993) [1978]. Encyclopedia of German Tanks of World War Two: A Complete Illustrated Directory of German Battle Tanks, Armoured Cars, Self-propelled Guns, and Semi-tracked Vehicles, 1933–1945. Technical Editor Thomas L. Jentz (Revised ed.). London: Arms and Armour Press. ISBN 1-85409-214-6.
- Doyle, Hilary Louis & Jentz, Thomas L. (2023). Flakpanzer IV and Other Flakpanzer Projects. Panzer Tracts. Vol. 12–1 (revised ed.). Old Heathfield, UK: Panzerwrecks. ISBN 978-1-915969-18-7.
- Ledwoch, J. (Shackleton, M. J. edited). Armour in Focus: Flakpanzer 38 (t) ISBN 978-83-7219-026-0
