= Panzer 38(t) =

Czechoslovak light tank used by Germany during WW2

Panzerkampfwagen 38(t)
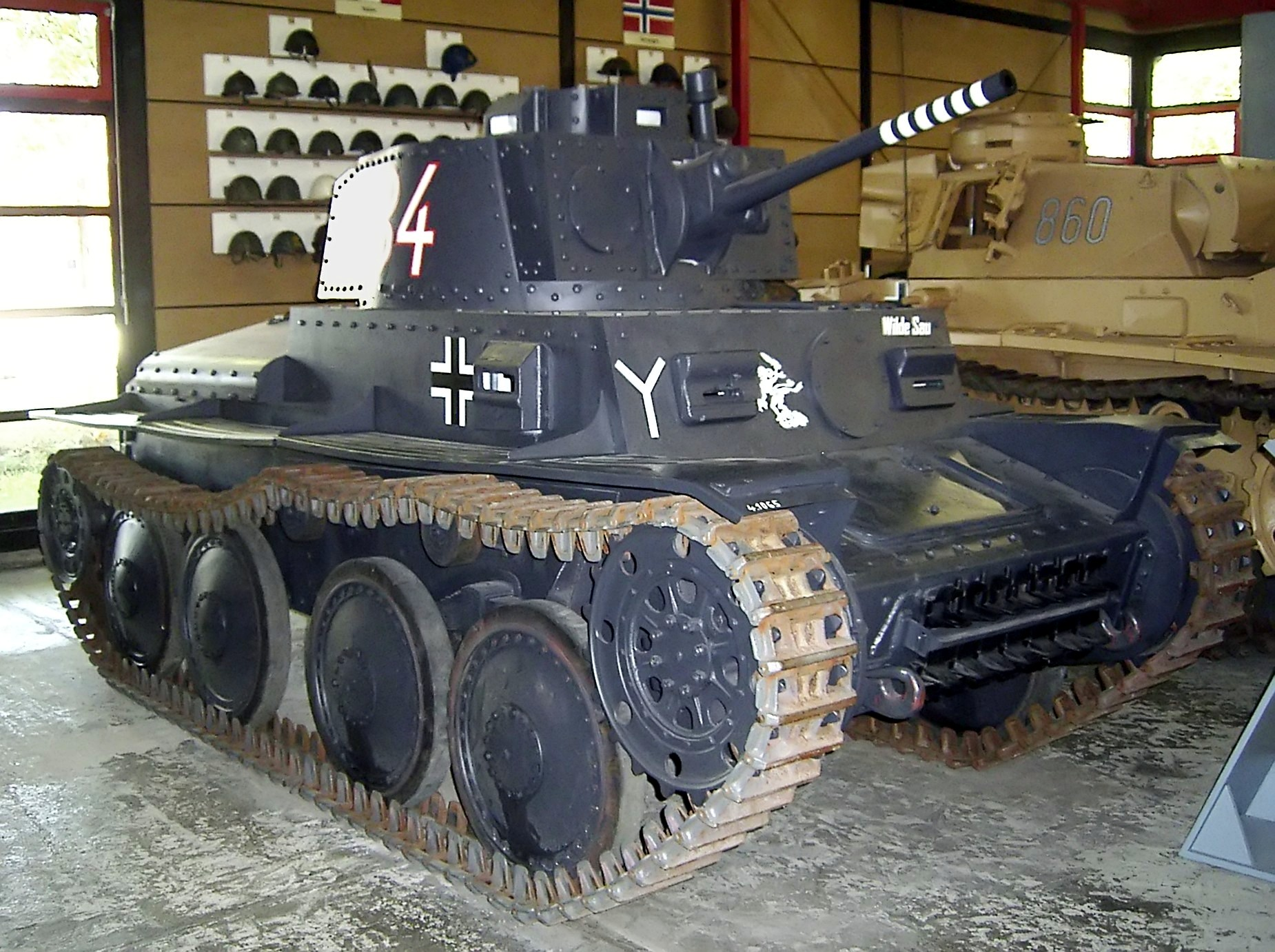
- Panzerkampfwagen 38(t) Ausf. S at the German Tank Museum
- Type: Light tank
- Place of origin: Czechoslovakia

Service history
- In service: 1939–1945 (Nazi Germany), 1938–1970 (Peru)
- Used by: Nazi Germany; Kingdom of Romania; Kingdom of Bulgaria; Hungary; Slovak Republic; Sweden; Switzerland; Peru; Iran
- Wars: World War II; Ecuadorian–Peruvian War; Internal conflict in Peru

Production history
- Designer: ČKD
- Manufacturer: ČKD
- Produced: 1939–1942
- No. built: 1,414 (for Germany)

Specifications
- Mass: 9.725–9.85 tonnes (9.571–9.694 long tons; 10.720–10.858 short tons)
- Length: 4.61 m (15 ft 1 in)
- Width: 2.14 m (7 ft 0 in)
- Height: 2.25 m (7 ft 5 in) (overall)
- Crew: 4 (in German service) / 3 (as originally designed)
- Armor: 8–30 mm (Ausf. A–D); 8–50 mm (Ausf. E–G)
- Main armament: 37 mm KwK 38(t) L/47.8
- Secondary armament: 2× 7.92 mm ZB-53 (MG 37(t)) machine guns
- Engine: Praga Typ TNHPS/II water-cooled, 6-cylinder gasoline engine 123.3 hp (125.0 PS; 91.9 kW)
- Power/weight: 13.15 PS/tonne
- Transmission: 5 + 1 Praga-Wilson Typ CV
- Suspension: Leaf spring
- Ground clearance: 0.40 m
- Fuel capacity: 220 litres (58 US gal)
- Operational range: 250 km (160 mi) (road); 160 km (99 mi) (cross-country)
- Maximum speed: 42 km/h, 26.1 mph (road); 15 km/h, 9.3 mph (off-road)

The Panzerkampfwagen 38(t), originally known as the Českomoravská Kolben-Daněk (ČKD) LT vz. 38, was a tank designed during the 1930s, which saw extensive service during World War II. Developed in Czechoslovakia by ČKD, the type was adopted by Nazi Germany following the German occupation of Czechoslovakia. With the German Army and other Axis forces, the type saw service in the invasions of Poland, France and the USSR. Production ended in 1942, when its main armament was deemed inadequate. In all, over 1,400 Pz. 38(t)s were manufactured. The chassis of the Pz. 38(t) continued to be produced for the Marder III (1942–1944) with some of its components used in the later Hetzer (Jagdpanzer 38, 1944–1945) tank destroyer and its derivative vehicles.

The (t) stands for tschechisch, the German word for Czech; the Czechoslovak military designation was LT vz. 38 (Lehký tank vzor 38, Light Tank model 38). Manufacturer's designations included TNH series, TNHPS, LTP and LTH. The special vehicle (Sonderkraftfahrzeug) designation for the tank in Germany was Sd. Kfz. 140.

== Description ==
The Panzer 38(t) was a conventional inter-war tank design, with riveted armour. The armour varied in thickness from 10 mm to 25 mm in most versions. Later models (Ausf. E on) increased this to 50 mm by bolting on an additional 25 mm armour plate to the front portion of the hull. The sides received an additional 15 mm increase of armour from Ausf. E production runs onward.

The two-man turret was centrally located, and housed the tank's main armament, a 37 mm Skoda A7 gun with 90 rounds of ammunition. In addition, a 7.92 mm machine gun was in a ball mount to the right of the main gun. This machine gun could be trained on targets independently of the main gun, or coupled to the main gun for use as a conventional coaxial machine gun.

The driver was in the front right of the hull, with the radio operator seated to the driver's left. The radio operator manned the hull-mounted 7.92 mm machine gun in front in addition to operating the radio on his left. The driver could also fire the hull machine gun with a trigger fitted on the left tiller bar. A total of 2,550 rounds were carried for the bow and turret machine guns.

In German service, a loader position was added to the turret by reducing the ammunition capacity by 18 rounds. All future Panzer 38(t) tanks were rebuilt according to this specification and those already in service were modified accordingly. The commander had to aim and fire the main gun in addition to his role as commander. Minor adjustments, such as adjustable seats for the driver and firmer footing for the commander/gunner and loader, were also made.

The engine was mounted in the rear of the hull and powered the tank through a transmission at the front of the hull with five forward gears and one reverse gear. The track ran under four rubber-tyred road wheels and back over a rear idler and two track return rollers. The wheels were mounted on a leaf-spring double-bogie mounted on two axles.

== Development ==
In 1935, the Czechoslovak tank manufacturer ČKD was looking for a replacement for the LT-35 tank they were jointly producing with Škoda Works. The LT-35 was complex and had shortcomings, and ČKD felt there would be orders both from the expanding Czechoslovak army and for export.

ČKD decided to use a leaf-spring suspension with four large wheels for their new tank with an export success under the name "TNH". With small variations for each customer, 50 were exported to Iran (TNHP), 24 each to Peru (LTP) and Switzerland (LTH). Lithuania also ordered some (LTL). The British Royal Armoured Corps (RAC) had one trial model delivered on 23 March 1939 to Gunnery School at Lulworth. A report stated that "the (bow) gunner could not sit back comfortably as the wireless set was in the way of his left shoulder". The report also stated that, due to the shudder while the vehicle was on the move, it was impossible to lay the gun. Even at the speed of 8 km/h (5 mph), accuracy was poor. As a result, the British did not purchase the LT-38 and the trial model was returned.

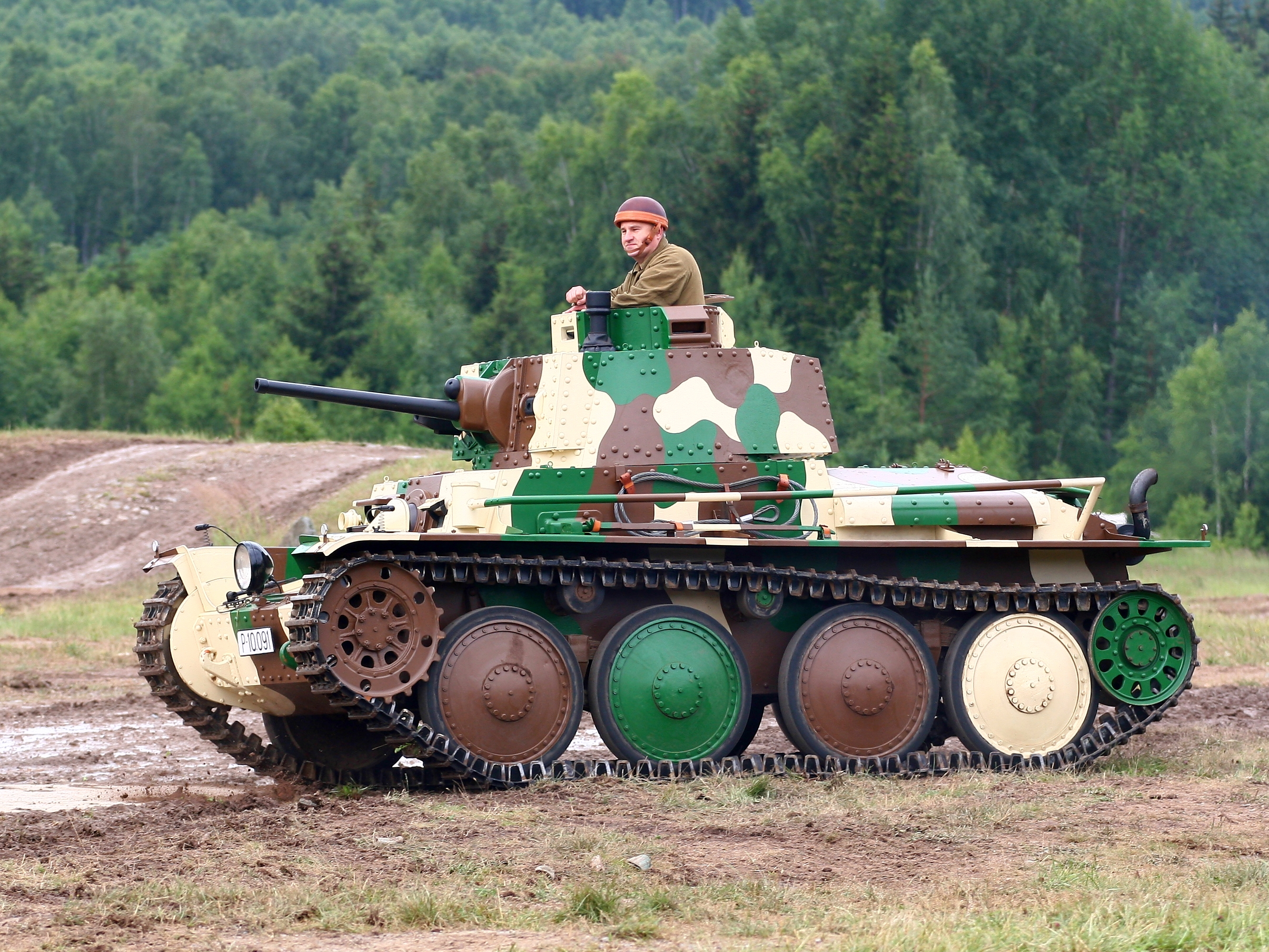
LT vz. 38 in Czechoslovak army camouflage

In the fall of 1937, the Czechoslovak Armed Forces launched a contest for a new medium tank; Škoda, ČKD and Tatra competed. Škoda Praga submitted the existing joint production export model mentioned above. ČKD also entered a prototype separate from the above, the interesting V-8-H (later called the ST vz. 39), which proved to have numerous mechanical problems. Tatra, known mostly for its smaller, wheeled armoured cars, submitted a paper entry that was a very novel concept that completely changed the layout of a tank, which concept they patented in 1938. On 1 July 1938, Czechoslovakia ordered 150 of the TNHPS model, although none had entered service by the time of the German occupation (March 1939).

=== German production ===
After the takeover of Czechoslovakia, Germany ordered continued production of the model as it was considered an excellent tank, especially compared to the Panzer I and Panzer II that were the Panzerwaffe's main tanks at the outset of World War II. It was first introduced into German service under the name LTM 38; this was changed on 16 January 1940 to Panzerkampfwagen 38(t).

The relatively small turret of the Panzer 38(t) could not accommodate a cannon powerful enough to defeat more heavily armoured tanks such as the T-34, so production of the Pz. 38(t) halted in June 1942 when more than 1,400 had been built. Other examples of the Pz. 38(t) were also sold to a number of other Axis nations, including Hungary (102), Slovakia (69), Romania (50), and Bulgaria (10, known as Praga).

The main advantages of the Panzer 38(t), compared to other tanks of the day, were high reliability and sustained mobility. In one documented case, a regiment was supplied with tanks driven straight from the factory in 2.5 days instead of the anticipated week, without any mechanical breakdowns. In the opinion of the crews, the drive components of the Pz. 38(t) – engine, gear, steering, suspension, wheels and tracks – were perfectly in tune with each other. The Pz. 38(t) was also considered to be very easy to maintain and repair.

After production of the Pz. 38(t) ceased, the chassis was used for tank destroyer designs, which were produced in greater numbers than the original Pz. 38(t). In 1942–1944, about 1,500 Marder IIIs were produced. The Marder was replaced by the Jagdpanzer 38(t) (Hetzer), based on a modified Panzer 38(t) chassis, of which approximately 2,800 were produced. The Panzer 38(t) chassis was also the basis for an anti-aircraft gun carrier, the Flakpanzer 38(t), of which about 140 were produced. The Aufklärungspanzer 38(t) (designation Sd.Kfz.140/1) was a reconnaissance vehicle based on a 38(t) tank fitted with a Hängelafette open-topped turret with mesh covers (20 mm KwK 38 L/55 gun and a coaxial MG 42 – adapted from the Sd.Kfz. 222 armoured car); a support version armed with a 75 mm KwK 37 L/24 (and MG 42) gun mounted in the modified superstructure was also designed. Seventy Aufklärungspanzer 38(t) with a 20 mm gun were built in February and March 1944; just two Aufklärungspanzer 38(t) with a 75 mm gun were built in 1944.

=== Swedish production ===
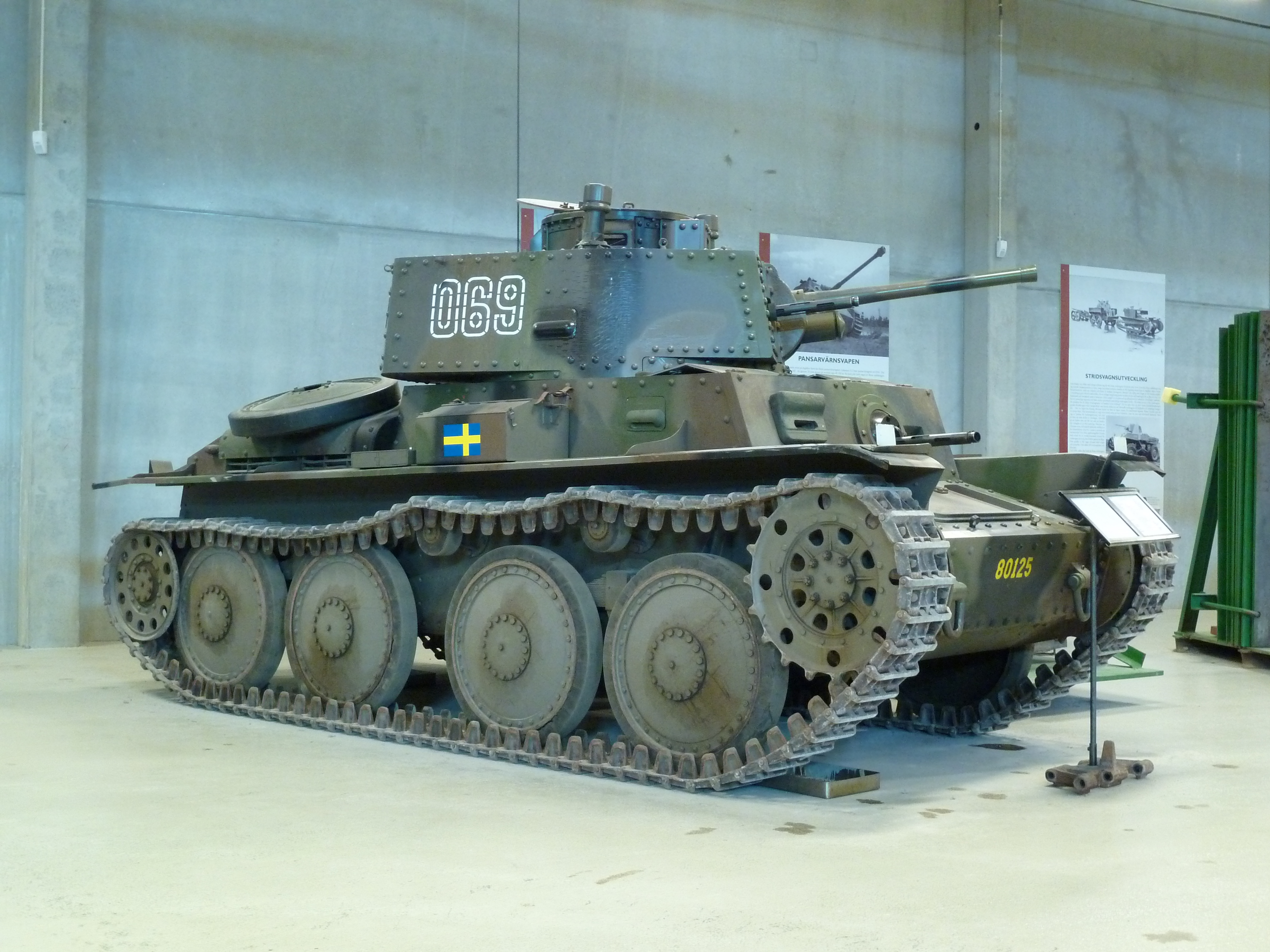
Stridsvagn m/41

Since the 90 PzKpfw 38(t) Ausf. S built for Sweden to be delivered in March 1940 were confiscated with the invasion of Czechoslovakia, negotiations with Böhmisch-Mährische-Maschinenfabrik for the blue-prints needed for license production commenced and an agreement was reached at the end of 1940, which included the upgrades for the TNHP-S. The riveted construction was seen as a drawback, but since redrawing the blueprints for a welded construction was estimated to delay production by almost a year, no changes were made to the 116 m/41 ordered from Scania-Vabis in June 1941. Deliveries started in December 1942 and were completed in August 1943, no less than three years behind the original plan.

While clearly outdated, the need for a 10-ton light tank was so pressing that another order was placed in mid 1942. Since Scania-Vabis had reached the production ceiling, the 122 tanks had to be complemented by some 80 strv m/40. The second batch had the frontal armour upgraded to 50 mm bringing the weight to 11 tonnes, and to deal with the increased weight the 145 hp Scania-Vabis typ 1664 was replaced by a more powerful 160 hp Scania-Vabis typ 603. Due to the larger size, the hull had to be made 65 mm longer causing a wider gap between the second and third roadwheel. This enabled the fueltanks to be upgraded from 190 litres to 230 litres. Only 104 got delivered when production ended in March 1944; the last 18 chassis were built as the assault gun Stormartillerivagn m/43 instead. Another 18 Sav m/43 were purpose built.

At the end of the 1950s, 220 SI & SII were converted to Pansarbandvagn 301 armoured personnel carriers (in use until 1971) and the turrets used for airbase defences.

== Operational history ==
=== Germany ===
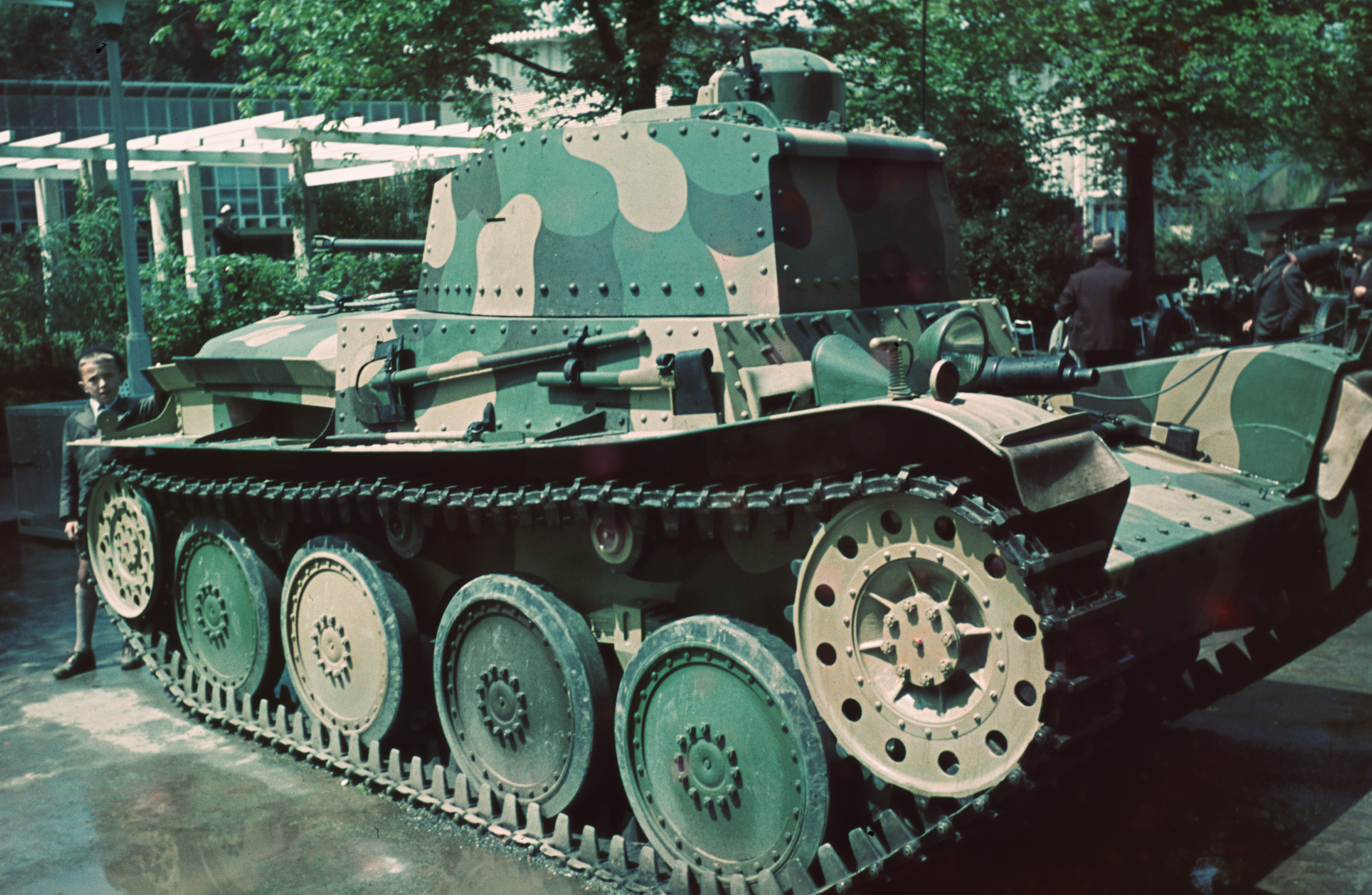
Tank LT vz. 38 in Swiss Army during the expo in Zürich in 1939

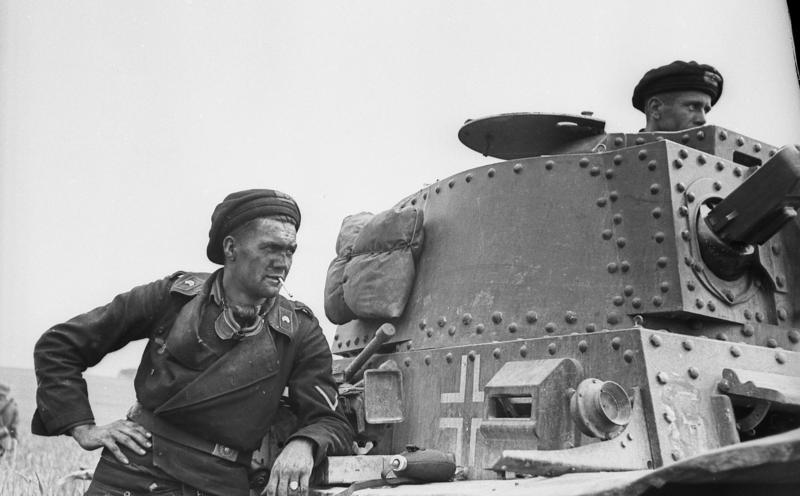
Panzer 38(t), France, June 1940

The Panzer 38(t) performed well in the invasion of Poland in 1939 and the Battle of France in 1940. It was better armed than the Panzer I and Panzer II tanks. It was on a par with most light tank designs of the era, although it was unable to effectively engage the frontal armour of medium, heavy and infantry tank designs.

It was also used in the German invasion of the Soviet Union from 1941 onwards in German and Hungarian units but, like other Axis tanks, was outclassed by Soviet tanks such as the T-34. Some ex-German units were issued to the Romanians in 1943, after the loss of many of the Romanian R-2 tanks. By then, it had become largely obsolete, though the chassis was adapted to a variety of different roles with success. Notable variations include the Sd.Kfz. 138 Marder III mobile anti-tank gun, the Sd.Kfz. 138/1 Grille mobile howitzer, Flakpanzer 38(t) and the Jagdpanzer 38(t) Hetzer tank destroyer. Small numbers were also used for reconnaissance, training and security duties, such as deployment on armoured trains.

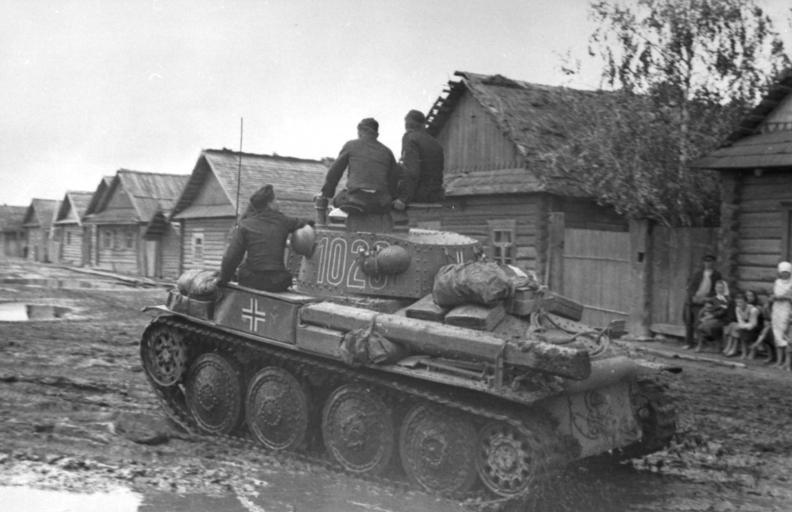
Panzer 38(t), Soviet Union, June 1941

The German tank commander Otto Carius, who was credited with over 150 'kills', described an action in a 38(t) on 8 July 1941,

It happened like greased lightning. A hit against our tank, a metallic crack, the scream of a comrade, and that was all there was! A large piece of armour plating had been penetrated next to the radio operator's seat. No one had to tell us to get out. Not until I had run my hand across my face while crawling in the ditch next to the road did I discover that they had also got me. Our radio operator had lost his left arm. We cursed the brittle and inelastic Czech steel that gave the Russian 47 mm anti-tank gun so little trouble. The pieces of our own armour plating and assembly bolts caused considerably more damage than the shrapnel of the round itself.

The above report highlights the reason why the 38(t) was pulled out of front lines in favour of the heavier Panzer III, Panzer IV, and StuG III. Panzer 38(t) continued to serve after 1941 as a reconnaissance vehicle and in anti-partisan units for some time. Several captured examples were refitted with Soviet DTM machineguns and employed by the Red Army.

At the start of Barbarossa, the Germans found Soviet T-34 tanks to be superior, as the German 37 mm Pak 36 anti-tank gun proved incapable of penetrating the T-34's armour. To neutralize the T-34, the Germans mounted a captured Soviet 76.2 mm gun on the chassis of the 38(t) model as a stop-gap measure and called it the Marder III. Crews of early Marder III models fought exposed on top of the engine deck.

==== Campaigns ====
- Invasion of Poland with the German 3rd Light Division
- Operation Weserübung (Denmark) with the German 31st Army Corps
- Battle of France with the 7th and 8th Panzer Divisions
- Operation Barbarossa and subsequent operations with the German 7th, 8th, 12th, 19th, 20th, 22nd Panzer Divisions, Hungarian First Armoured Field Division and Slovak Fast division
- Eastern Front operations with the Romanian 2nd Tank Regiment, the T-38 Tank Battalion, in the Kuban and Crimea between 1943 and 1944.
- Slovak National Uprising: 13 tanks of this type were used by the Slovak insurgent army.

=== Iran ===
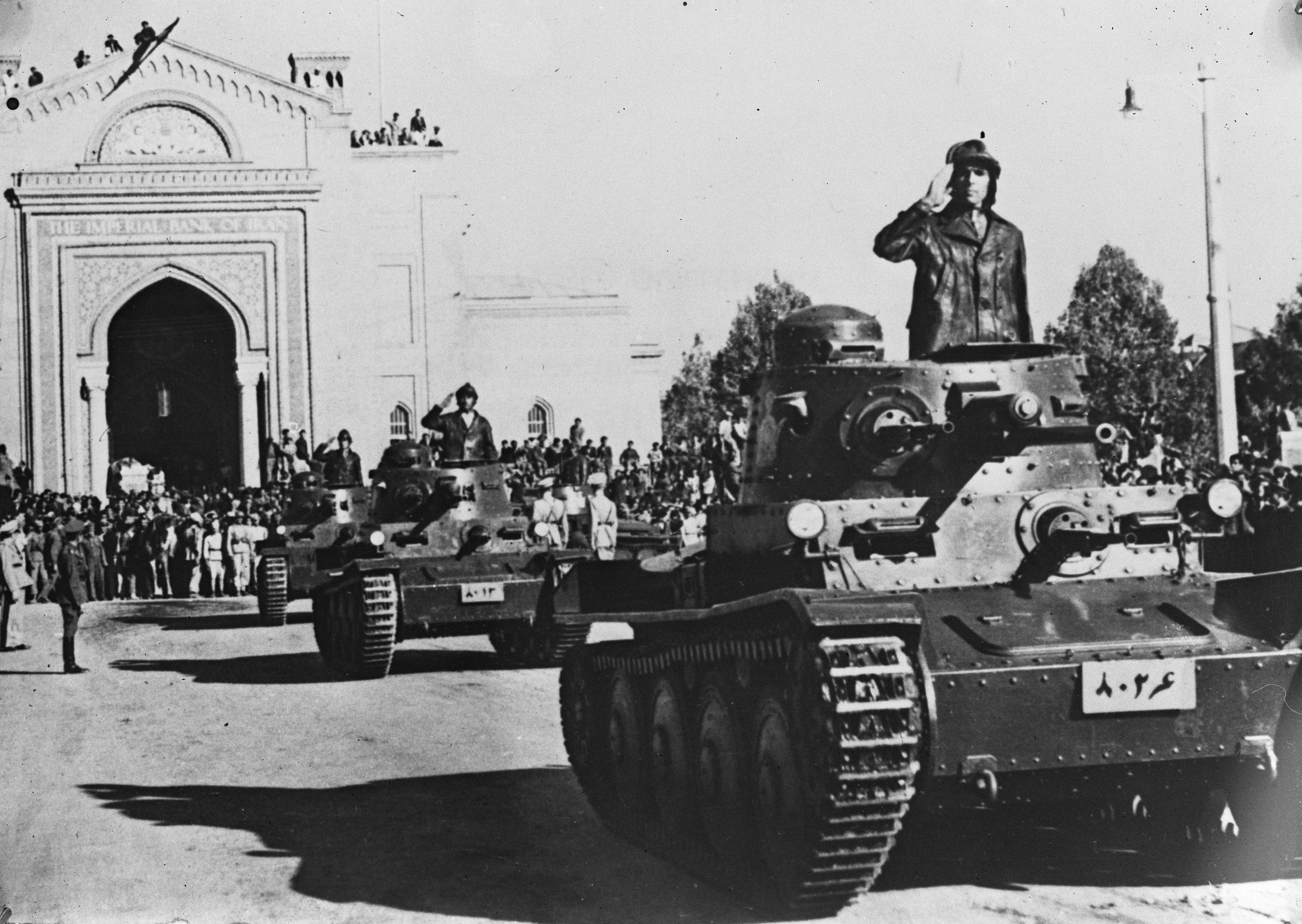
TNH tanks at military parade in Tehran, December 1946

Iran purchased 50 TNH tanks armed with a Skoda 37mm gun. A further order of 200 was interrupted by the German occupation of Czechoslovakia. Iranian TNHs were assigned to the 1st and 2nd Divisions and the Imperial Guards but were overwhelmed by the 1000 tanks used by the Soviet Army in the Anglo-Soviet invasion in August 1941.

=== Peru ===
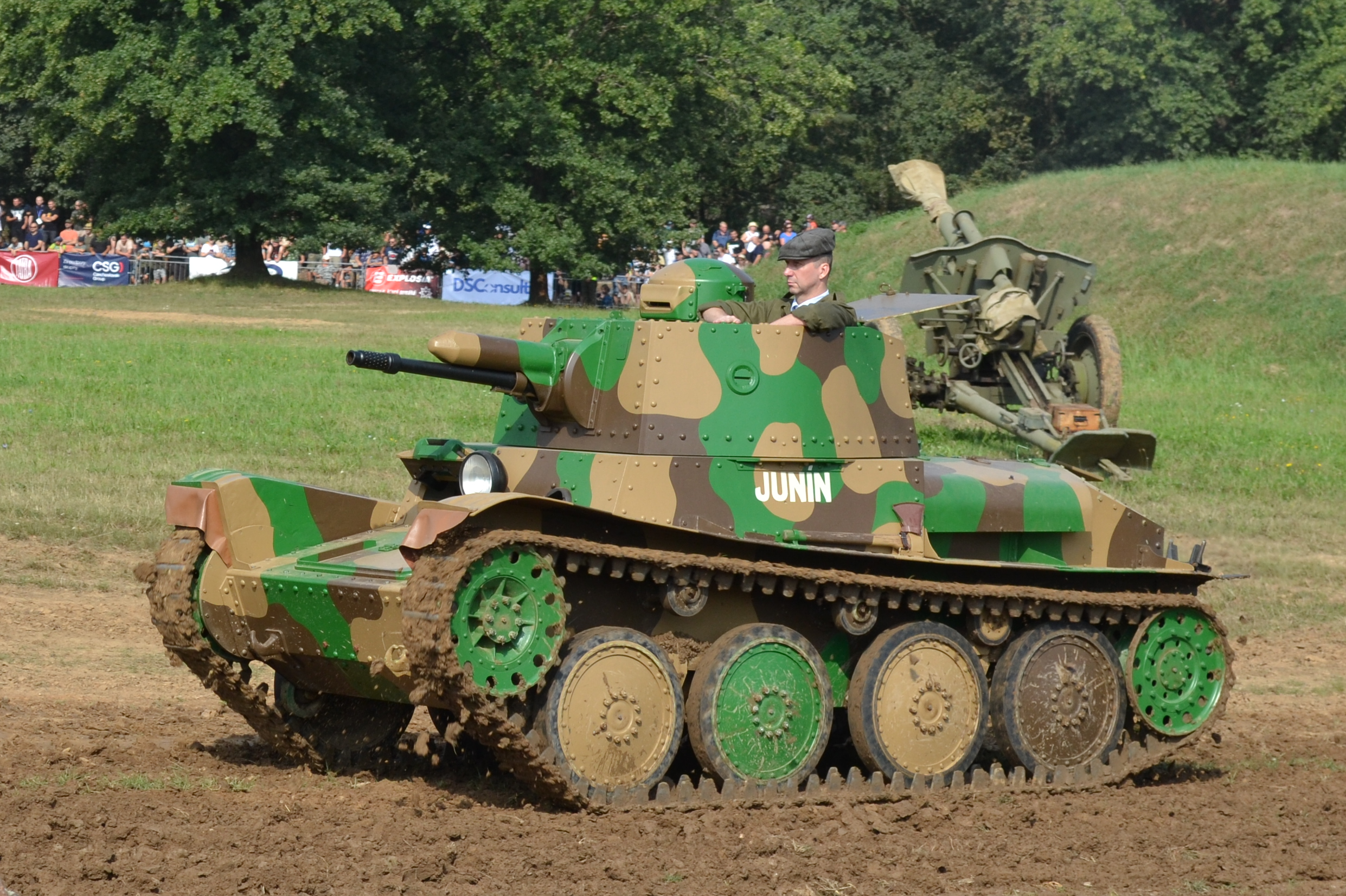
Renovated LTP at Lešany military museum

A Peruvian mission went to Europe in 1935 and looked at tanks from several major manufacturers before settling on the Czech LTP. Peru bought 24 of them. They were delivered in 1938–1939 and designated Tanque 38 (then Tanque 39). This small armoured force of two tank companies was complemented by truck-mounted infantry and artillery pulled by tractors (the Czech ČKD). Peruvian doctrine was influenced by the French military mission operating in Peru at the time, and emphasized the use of tanks to support infantry attacks rather than in independent mobile columns (as in the German Blitzkrieg).

The Peruvian tank battalion played an important role in the 1941 Ecuadorian–Peruvian War, spearheading the attack across the Zarumilla River and at Arenillas. This was helped by the fact that the Ecuadorian Army had no modern anti-tank guns and their artillery was horse-drawn. Ultimately the last LTP tanks would see retirement from active service only in 1988.

The tanks were also used for counter-insurgency operations against the Shining Path.

=== Hungary ===
With a local designation T-38 was used by the Royal Hungarian army. 108 were handed over between 1941 and 1942. 92 deployed with the 1.st Field Armoured Division.

=== Romania ===
The T-38 was the local designation for the wartime deliveries of Panzer 38(t)s from Germany in 1943, which formed the T-38 Tank Battalion, on 5 July 1943, within the structure of the 2nd Tank Regiment, with the 51st, 52nd, and 53rd companies of 16 T-38s plus one company command tank, under the command of major Victor Popescu. The T-38 served with the forces operating in Kuban and later with the 54th Company, formed on 2 November 1943 with 3 tanks from the 53rd Company and 5 more from the battalion's reserve, attached to the HQ and the cavalry corps in Kuban and Crimea. T-38 tanks were still in action with the 10th Infantry Division and Cavalry Divisions in 1944. The T-38s were used to repulse Soviet landings in Kuban or Crimea and help fend off attacks in different sectors of the front, and later on deal with the partisans of Crimea in late 1943.

=== Slovakia ===
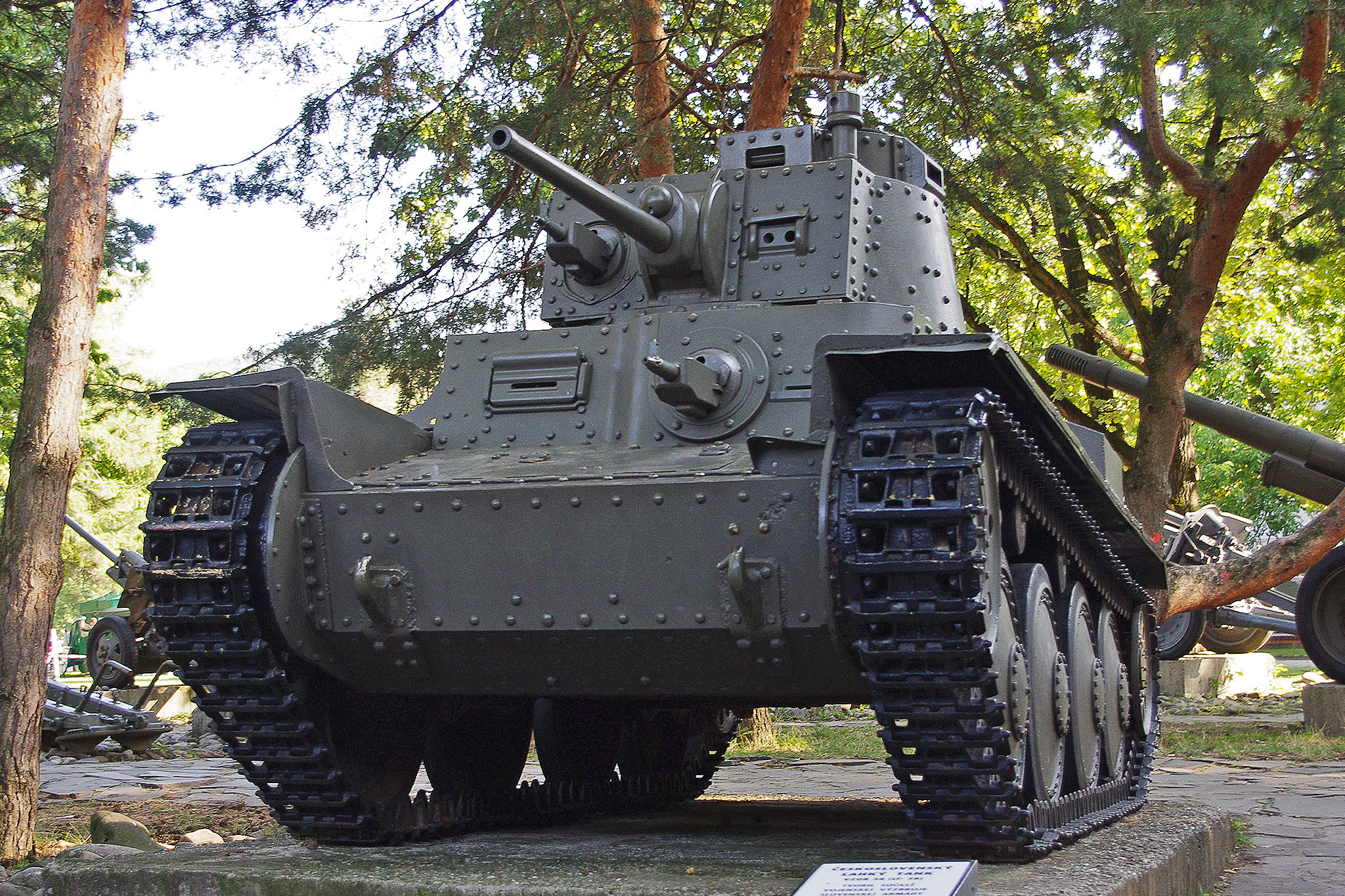
Slovak LT-38 tank in Museum of Slovak National Uprising in Banská Bystrica.

In the Slovak Army, this tank received the designation LT-38. Because of the first series of the LT-38 was not yet finished in March 1939, when Czechoslovakia dissolved, and as the first series was seized by Nazi Germany, the army of the Slovak State, which was a German ally in the Polish and Soviet campaigns, initially had only LT-35 tanks. In 1940 the Slovak Army ordered 10 tanks, which were used in Operation Barbarossa. All of them were used at the Eastern Front in the Fast division in the Battalion of Assault Vehicles. Two tanks were destroyed; the other 8 tanks later returned to Slovakia. After that, the Slovak Army ordered another 27 tanks, and when the Germans started withdrawing Panzer 38(t) tanks, the Slovak Army received another 37 tanks from Germany. Thirteen tanks of this type were used by Slovak insurgents during the Slovak National Uprising in 1944.

The Slovak Army also used the LT-40, which was based on the same chassis as the LT-38, but it was smaller and had a different turret. These tanks were initially manufactured for Lithuania but because it was occupied by USSR from 1940, the order had been not realised. Instead, these tanks were acquired by Slovakia. Yet in 1940, the Slovak Army received 21 tanks. They were delivered without guns, machine guns, radio stations or optics. Slovak army equipped them with machine guns and the tanks took part in the Slovak army's campaign in the USSR. During the battle near Lipovec, one tank was destroyed. Afterwards, the other machines were rearmed with Škoda A7 37 mm guns. Several tanks were used by the Slovak Army during the attack on the Caucasus, where some of them were lost in the fight. Remaining tanks were taken back to Slovakia, and some of them were used by Slovak Insurgent Army in the Slovak National Uprising in 1944.

One complete LT-38 tank in Slovak camouflage and one LT-38 torso are displayed in the Museum of the Slovak National Uprising in Banská Bystrica. Tank 313, the torso of which can be seen in the museum, was the third tank of the first order and saw combat on the Eastern front. Later it was used for training because of its high mileage. During the Slovak National Uprising it was used by insurgents, but because its engine failed, it was abandoned.

=== Sweden ===
All Strv m/41 SI were sent to P 3 in Strängnäs, who were the only regiment who painted the road-wheels in the same camouflage pattern as the hull against regulations prescribing field-grey to be used. Most of the m/41 SII went to P 4 in Skövde, with a small number allocated to P 2 in Hässleholm and the material reserve of P 3. All tanks had been retired from active service in the mid-1950s and later rebuilt into Pansarbandvagn 301 armoured personnel carriers (APCs).

== Technical data ==
=== TNHP-S ===
- General
  - Role: Light/medium tank
  - Manufacturer: ČKD
  - Crew: Commander, loader, driver, bow machine gunner-radio operator
- Armament and armour
  - Main armament: 37.2 mm Skoda A7 gun
  - Coaxial armament: 7.92 mm machine gun
  - Bow armament: 7.92 mm machine gun
  - Ammunition: 90 rounds of 37.2 mm and 2,550 rounds of 7.92 mm
  - armour: 10 mm to 25 mm
- Power and weight
  - Engine: Praga EPA six-cylinder inline water-cooled petrol
  - Transmission: 5 forward, 1 reverse
  - Power: 110,3 kW (148 hp)
  - Weight: 9,700 kg (21,400 lb)
  - Power/Weight: 11.5 kW/metric ton (14.0 hp/short ton)
- Performance
  - Max road speed: 42 km/h
  - Max range: 200 km
  - Fording: 0.9 m
  - Gradient: 60%
  - Vertical obstacle: 0.8 m
  - Trench: 1.9 m
- Dimensions
  - Length: 4.55 m
  - Width: 2.13 m
  - Height: 2.31 m

=== Panzer 38(t) Aus. A-C ===
- Crew: 4
- Armament and armour
  - Main armament: 37.2 mm Skoda A7 (L/47.8) gun with 90 rounds
  - Secondary armament: 2 x 7.92 mm MG 37(t) (Model 37) machine gun with 2,550 rounds.
  - Armour: front 25 mm, side 15 mm
- Power
  - Engine: Praga EPA Model I inline six-cylinder, liquid-cooled, petrol
  - Bore: 110 mm (~ 4.331 in)
  - Stroke: 136 mm (~ 5.354 in)
  - Displacement: 7754,7 cc (~ 473.22 cu in)
  - Power: 91,9 kW (123.3 hp, 125 PS)
  - Transmission: 5 forward, 1 reverse
  - Weight: combat: 9.5 tonnes, dry: 8.5 tonnes
  - Power/Weight: 10 kW/metric ton (13.0 hp/short ton)
- Performance
  - Speed: 56 km/h (35 mph)
  - Range: 200 km (120 mi)
- Dimensions
  - Length: 4.61 m
  - Width: 2.14 m
  - Height: 2.40 m

== Variants ==
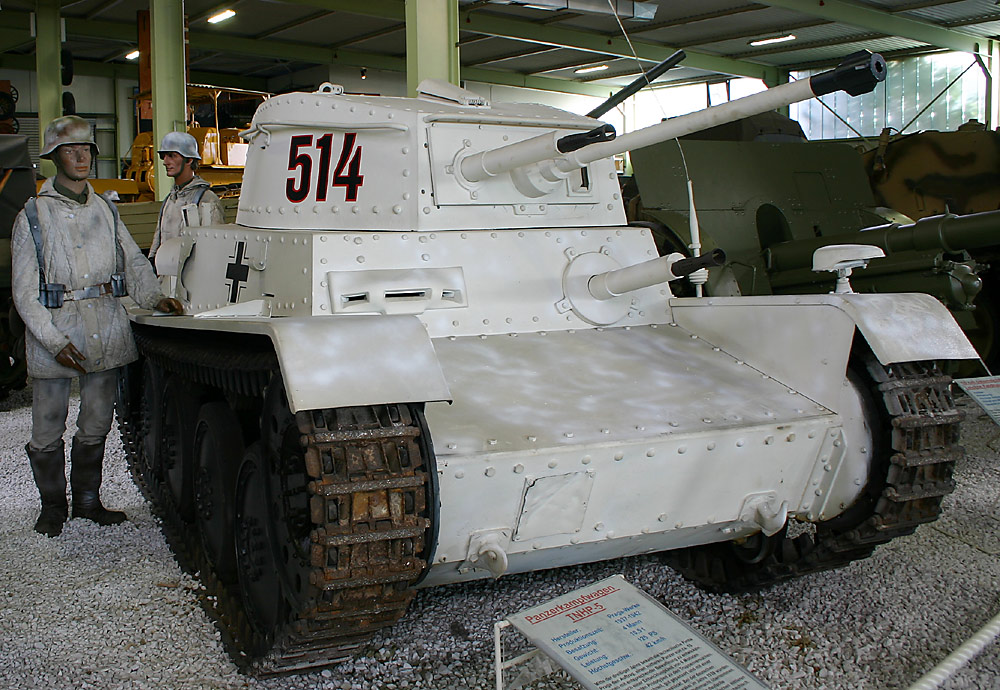
An LTH camouflaged as a German Panzer 38(t)

- TNHP Initial export version to Iran (50 ordered in 1935) (Iran was the first customer)
- LTP export version to Peru, Peruvian designation is Tanque 38/Tanque 39
- LTH export version to Switzerland (24 without weapons) Modified turret.
- LTL export version to Lithuania (21 ordered, none delivered due to Soviet annexation), later used by Slovakia as LT-40
- LT vz. 38 Czechoslovak Army designation (none entered service)
- LT-38 Slovak Army designation
- LT-40 Slovak Army designation for the LTL tanks taken-over from the Lithuania order
- PzKpfw 38(t) Ausf. A-D TNH tank in German manufacture
- PzKpfw 38(t) Ausf. E-F Pz 38(t) with frontal armour increased to 50 mm by bolting on an additional 25 mm armour
- PzKpfw 38(t) Ausf. S 90 TNH ordered by Sweden in February 1940 but seized by Germany, intermediate design between Ausf. D and E
- PzKpfw 38(t) Ausf. G Pz 38(t) with integral 50 mm frontal armour
- PzKpfw 38(t) n.A. modified version of the Panzer 38(t), used welded armor instead of riveted armor. Uses modified turret.
- Panzerbefehlswagen 38(t) command version of the Panzer 38(t). Additional radio antennas fitted, including a frame antenna over the rear upper hull. The hull-mounted machine gun was removed to make room for the radio equipment.
- Stridsvagn m/41 S(eries)I, Swedish license-built TNH version as compensation for the seized Ausf. S tanks. 116 produced.
- Stridsvagn m/41 S(eries)II, Strv m/41 with upgraded armour and stronger engine. 104 produced.

=== Other designs based on 38(t) chassis ===
- Marder III (Sd.Kfz. 138) - German Panzerjäger (tank destroyer); German 7.5 cm Pak 40 gun in open-top superstructure.
- Marder III (Sd.Kfz. 139) - German tank destroyer; Soviet-based 7.62 cm Pak 36(r) gun in open-top superstructure.
- Sd.Kfz. 138/1 Grille - German self-propelled gun; German 15 cm sIG 33 heavy infantry gun in open-top superstructure.
  - Also Munitionspanzer 38 (Sf) Ausf. K (Sd.Kfz.. 138/1). ammunition carrier variant, which carried ammunition for the SP gun.
- Flakpanzer 38 (Sd.Kfz. 140) - German self-propelled anti-aircraft gun; 2 cm Flak 38 anti-aircraft gun in open-top superstructure.
- Sd.Kfz. 140/1 Aufklärungspanzer 38 mit 2 cm KwK 38 - German reconnaissance tank with 20 mm turret from a Sd.Kfz. 222 armoured car (70 built).
- Sd.Kfz. 140/1 Aufklärungspanzer 38 mit 7.5 cm K 51 L/24 - German close-support reconnaissance tank with 7.5 cm gun mounted in a modified superstructure (2 built).
- Jagdpanzer 38 - German tank destroyer carrying a 7.5 cm PaK 39 anti-tank gun in enclosed superstructure.
  - G-13 - Swiss designation for postwar-built Jagdpanzer 38(t) sold by Czechoslovakia.
- Nahkampfkanone 1 - Swiss built tank destroyer, similar to Marder III (1 built).
- Pansarbandvagn 301 - Swedish Stridsvagn m/41 (SI and SII) rebuilt to armoured personnel carriers (220 converted).
- Stormartillerivagn m/43 - Swedish assault gun based on the m/41 SII chassis (36 built).
- TACAM T-38 - Romanian tank destroyer.

== See also ==
- Panzer 35(t)
- Weapons of Czechoslovakia interwar period
- German armoured fighting vehicle production during World War II
- Tank classification
- List of military vehicles
