= Bofors 57 mm anti-tank gun =

Anti-tank gun designed by Bofors

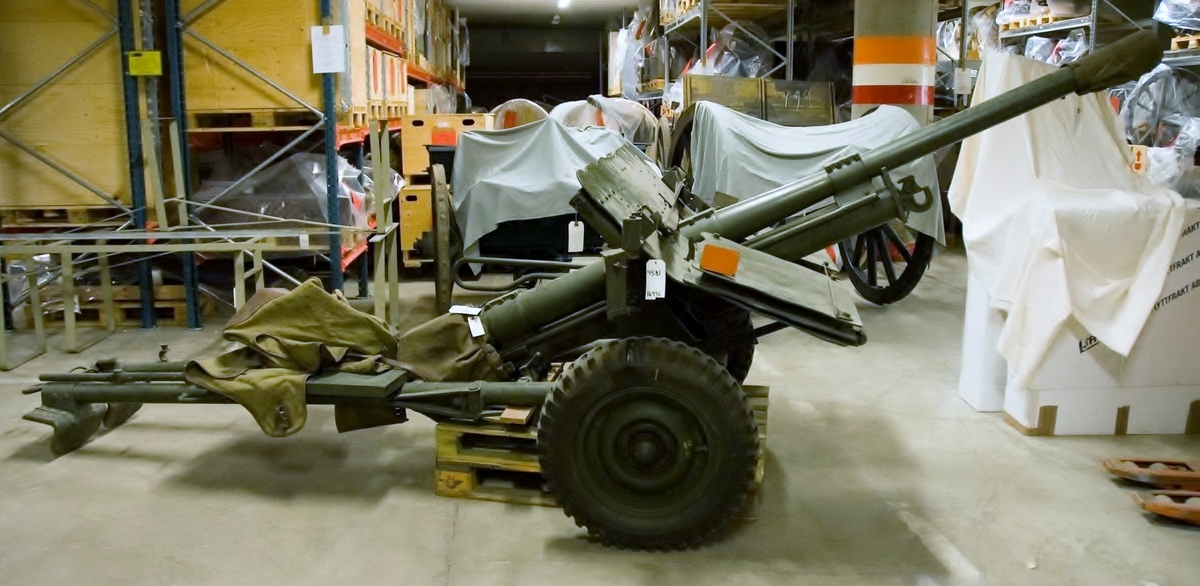
- Type: Anti-tank gun
- Place of origin: Sweden

Service history
- In service: 1940s to 1960s
- Used by: Sweden
- Wars: World War II

Production history
- Designed: 1943
- Manufacturer: Bofors AB
- Produced: 1944-47
- No. built: 215

Specifications
- Mass: 975 kg (2,150 lb)
- Length: 4.08 m (13 ft 5 in)
- Barrel length: 2.6 m (8 ft 6 in) L/46.8
- Width: 1.09 m (3 ft 7 in)
- Crew: 4-5
- Shell: 57 mm × 385R mm 2.5 kg (5 lb 8 oz)
- Caliber: 57 mm (2.2 in)
- Barrels: Single barrel
- Breech: Vertical sliding-block
- Recoil: Hydro-pneumatic; 800 mm (2 ft 7 in)
- Carriage: Split trail
- Elevation: -10° to +25°
- Traverse: 55°
- Rate of fire: 12 rpm
- Muzzle velocity: 850 m/s (2,800 ft/s)
- Effective firing range: 1 km (0.62 mi) Anti-tank; 4 km (2.5 mi) Indirect fire
- Maximum firing range: 8.5 km (5 mi)
- Sights: Binocular sight w/43

The Bofors 57 mm anti-tank gun was an anti-tank gun that was designed by Bofors during the mid 1940s and was designated the 57 mm Pvkan m/43. The gun was a scaled-up version of the 37 mm anti-tank gun m/38. The gun armed the Pansarskyddskompani (Panzer Protection Companies) of infantry regiments. However, the increased weight of the gun made it difficult to pull by hand in Sweden's rugged terrain. The gun could be fitted with a 20 mm sub-caliber training barrel for gunnery practice. When heavier tanks began to become common in the late 1940s, the gun was quickly relegated to other roles. The gun was replaced by the 9 cm pvp 1110 recoilless rifle and guided anti-tank missiles.

== Variants ==
- An experimental tank destroyer with a Pvkan m/43 that was mounted in a large square open-topped turret on the chassis of the Strv m/41 light tank and given the designation Pansarvärnskanonvagn III (Armor defense cannon car), or Pvkv III for short. However, by the time it began testing increases in the armor protection of contemporary tanks led to the design of the related Pansarvärnskanonvagn II, or Pvkv II for short. It used the same turret and chassis but was armed with a more powerful lvkan m/37 A 75 mm gun.
- Another experimental tank destroyer with a fully enclosed turret based on the chassis of the Landsverk L-60 and designated Pansarvärnskanonvagn IV, or Pvkv IV for short was also tested but was also unsuccessful.

== Armor Penetration ==
With SLPGR M/43 APHE round.
Penetration	Range	Angle
92 mm (3.6 in)	100 m (110 yd)	0°
75 mm (3.0 in)	400 m (440 yd)	0°
35 mm (1.4 in)	1,000 m (1,100 yd)	90°
15 mm (0.59 in)	1,400 m (1,500 yd)	50°
15 mm (0.59 in)	1,800 m (2,000 yd)	90°

=== Weapons of comparable role, performance and era ===
- Ordnance QF 6-pounder: British anti-tank gun
- 57 mm anti-tank gun M1943 (ZiS-2) : Soviet anti-tank gun
- 5 cm Pak 38 : German anti-tank gun

== Gallery ==
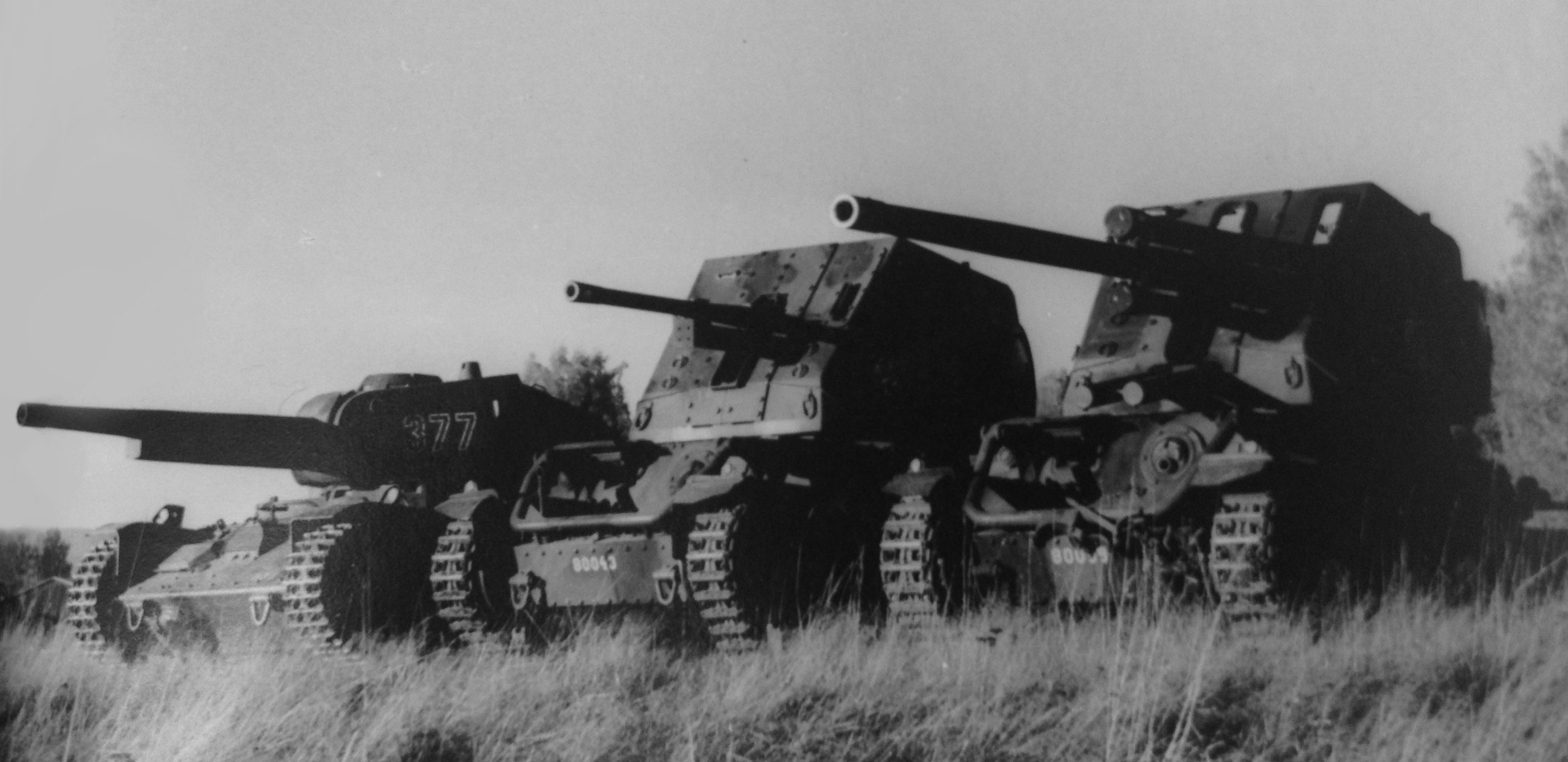
From left to right the Pvkv IV, Pvkv III and Pvkv II.
