= Flakpanzer IV =

1944 German self-propelled anti-aircraft gun family

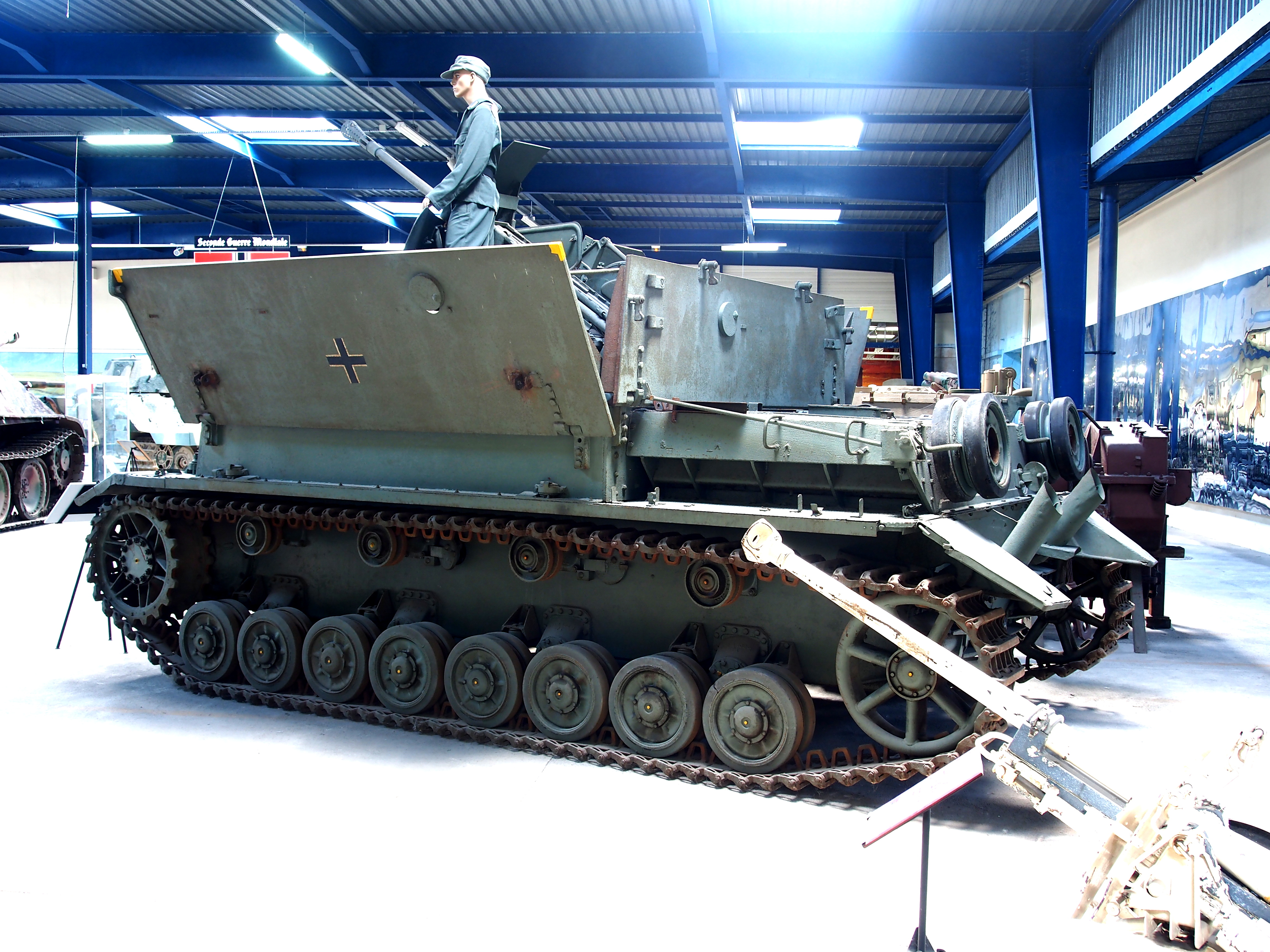
Flakpanzer_IV Mobelwagen

Flakpanzer IV is the general designation for a series of self-propelled anti-aircraft guns based on the Panzerkampfwagen IV chassis. They are, in order of development:

- Möbelwagen (furniture van) – Originally developed as the Flakpanzer 38(t); entered into production in 1943.
- Wirbelwind (whirlwind) – Installed an open-top rotating turret; introduced at the end of 1943.
- Ostwind (east wind) – Ordered in August 1944 to replace the Wirbelwind.
- Kugelblitz (ball lightning) – First prototypes delivered in February 1945.
