= Stridsvagn m/41 =

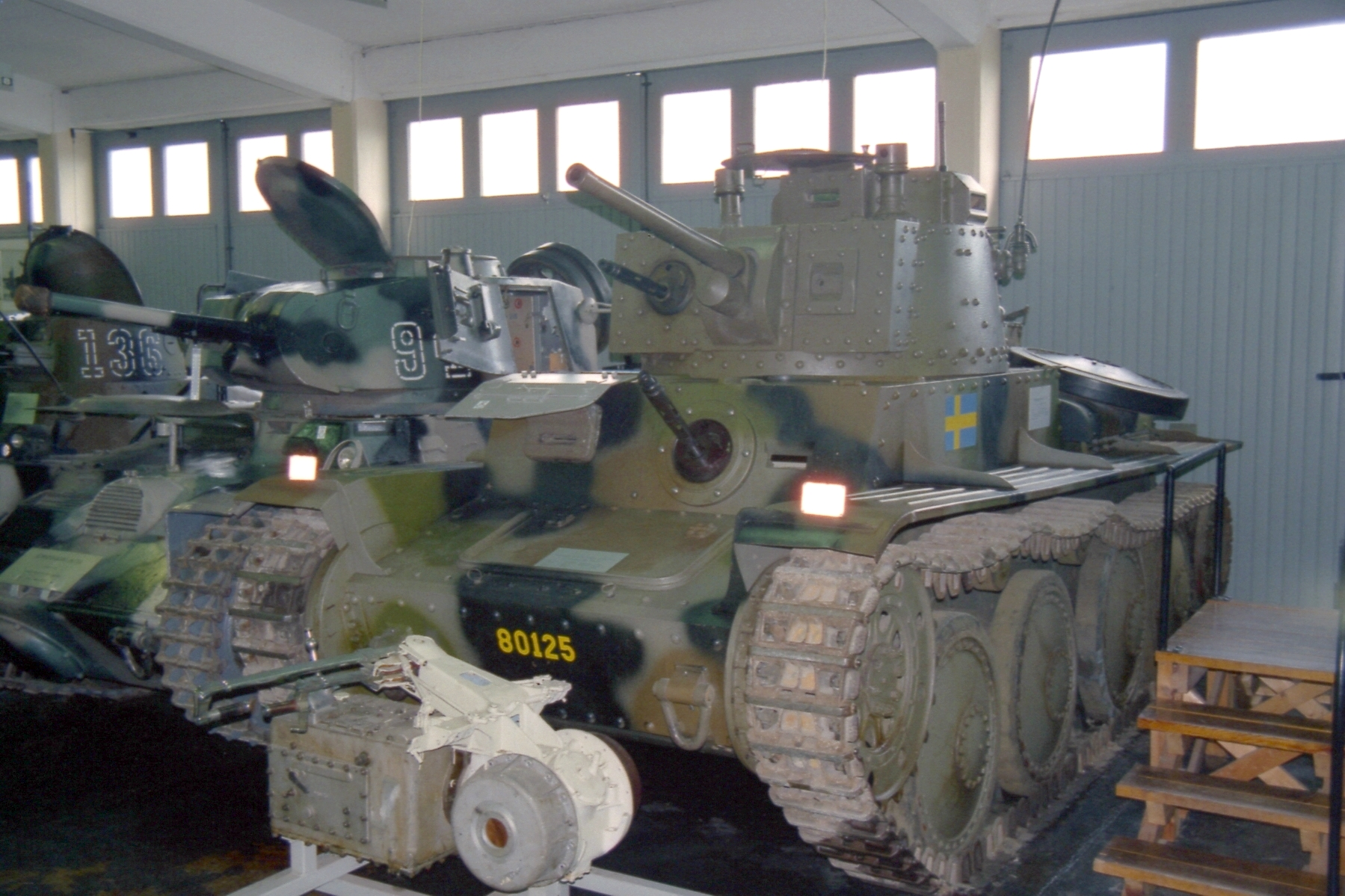
- Stridsvagn m/41 S-II at Pansarmuseet Axvall, Sweden
- Type: Medium tank
- Place of origin: Sweden

Service history
- In service: 1942-1950s
- Used by: Sweden

Production history
- Manufacturer: Scania-Vabis
- No. built: 220
- Variants: Strv m/41 SI; Strv m/41 SII; Sav m/43 Pbv 301

Specifications
- Mass: 11 t (12 short tons; 11 long tons)
- Length: 4.6 m (15 ft 1 in)
- Width: 2.14 m (7 ft 0 in)
- Height: 2.35 m (7 ft 9 in)
- Crew: 4
- Armor: 8–50 mm (0.31–1.97 in)
- Main armament: 37 mm Bofors m/38 gun
- Secondary armament: 2 x 8 mm m/39 machine guns
- Engine: SI: Scania-Vabis 1664; SII: Scania-Vabis L 603; SI: 142 hp SII: 160 hp
- Transmission: 5 speed Praga-Wilson preselected gearbox
- Suspension: leaf spring
- Ground clearance: 0.40 m (1 ft 4 in)
- Maximum speed: 42 km/h (26 mph)

Stridsvagn m/41 (Strv m/41) was a Swedish medium tank. A license-built version of the Czechoslovak TNH medium tank, it served into the 1950s.

== History ==
Since 1937, the Swedish army had been interested in the Czechoslovak TNH tank. In March 1940, some 90 tanks were ordered from ČKD. They were never delivered as Germany, which had occupied Czechoslovakia in 1938, took them for its coming campaign in the East. After negotiations with the German authorities, Scania-Vabis were allowed to build for Swedish army their own tanks under license, as compensation for the seized TNH tanks.

== Production history ==
In June 1941, 116 Stridsvagn m/41 SI were ordered. These were delivered from December 1942 - August 1943. The Stridsvagn m/41 was of rivetted construction which made manufacture easier. As with the preceding Strv m/38-Strv m/40, it was armed with a 37 mm Bofors m/38 gun, and the first batch had the same engine as the Strv m/40L, the Scania-Vabis type 1664.

In June 1942, a further 122 Stridsvagn m/41 were ordered under the designation Strv m/41 SII. These had thicker frontal armor and Scania's new type L 603 engine. The first SII vehicles were delivered in October 1943. The last 18 of the 122 ordered were rebuilt as assault guns (Sav m/43) and production of SII ceased in March 1944 after 104 vehicles had been delivered.

== Service ==
The SI tanks were assigned to P3 regiment in Strängnäs, where they equipped the 10th Armored Brigade's light tank companies. The SII tanks were mainly located to the 9th Armored Brigade at P4 regiment in Skövde, while others belonged to the reserve of the P2 and P3 regiments. They were painted in a three-color camouflage.

Stridsvagn m/41 were used until the late 1950s, when they were rebuilt to APCs under the designation Pbv 301. The turrets of these tanks were used on fortifications.

All of the original m/41 were converted to armoured personnel carriers. A Sav m/43 rebuilt as a m/41 is displayed by the "Sveriges Försvarsfordonsmuseum Arsenalen" in Strängnäs.

=== Variants ===
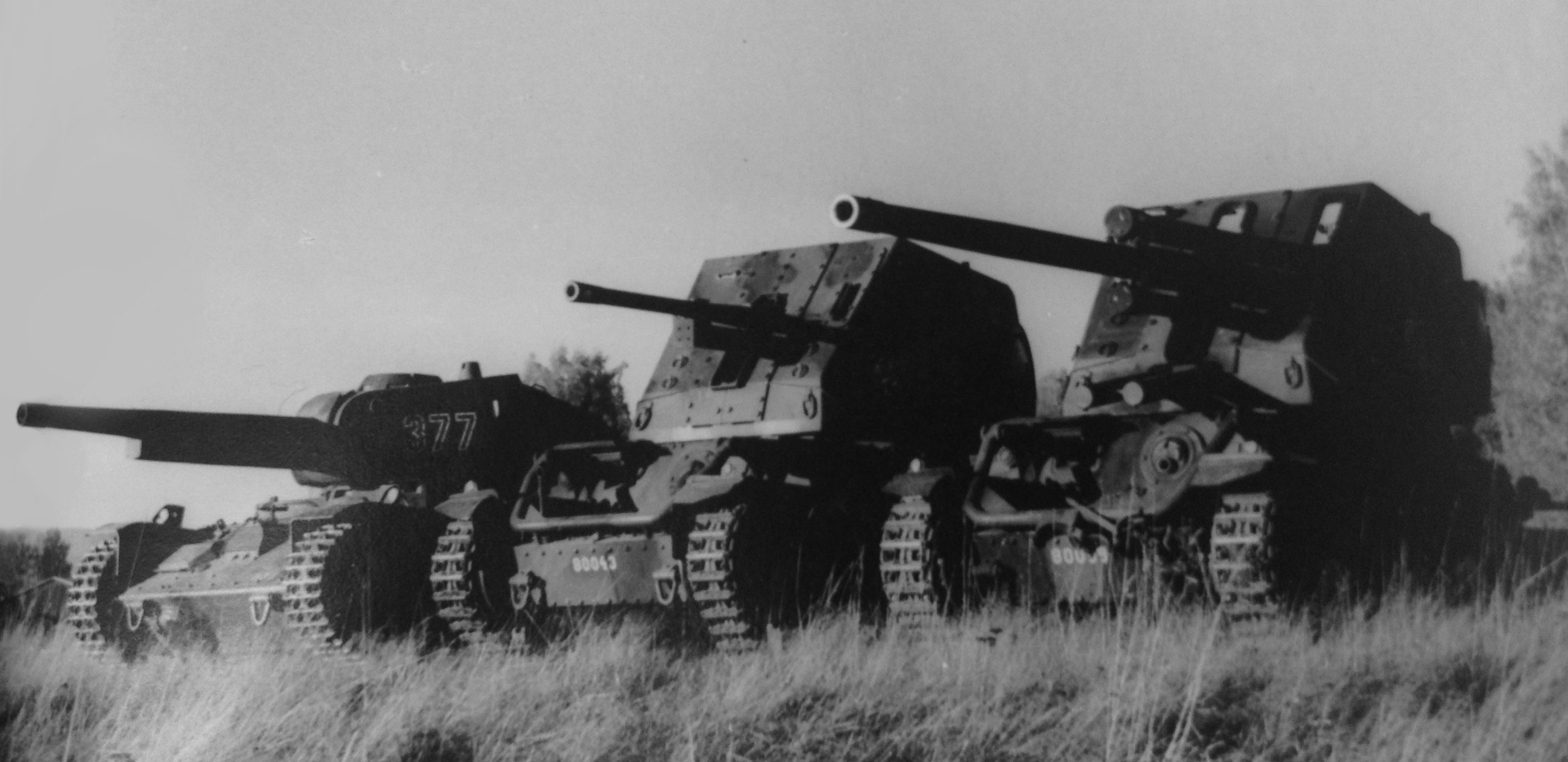
From left to right the Pvkv IV, Pvkv III and Pvkv II.

A tank gun designated the 57 mm Pvkan m/43 was mounted in a large square open-topped turret on the chassis of the Strv m/41 and given the designation Pansarvärnskanonvagn III (Armor defense cannon car), or Pvkv III for short. The Pvkv III was a tank destroyer and the related Pansarvärnskanonvagn II, or Pvkv II for short used the same turret and chassis but was armed with a lvkan m/37 A 75 mm gun.
