= Pansarbandvagn 301 =

Swedish second generation infantry fighting vehicle

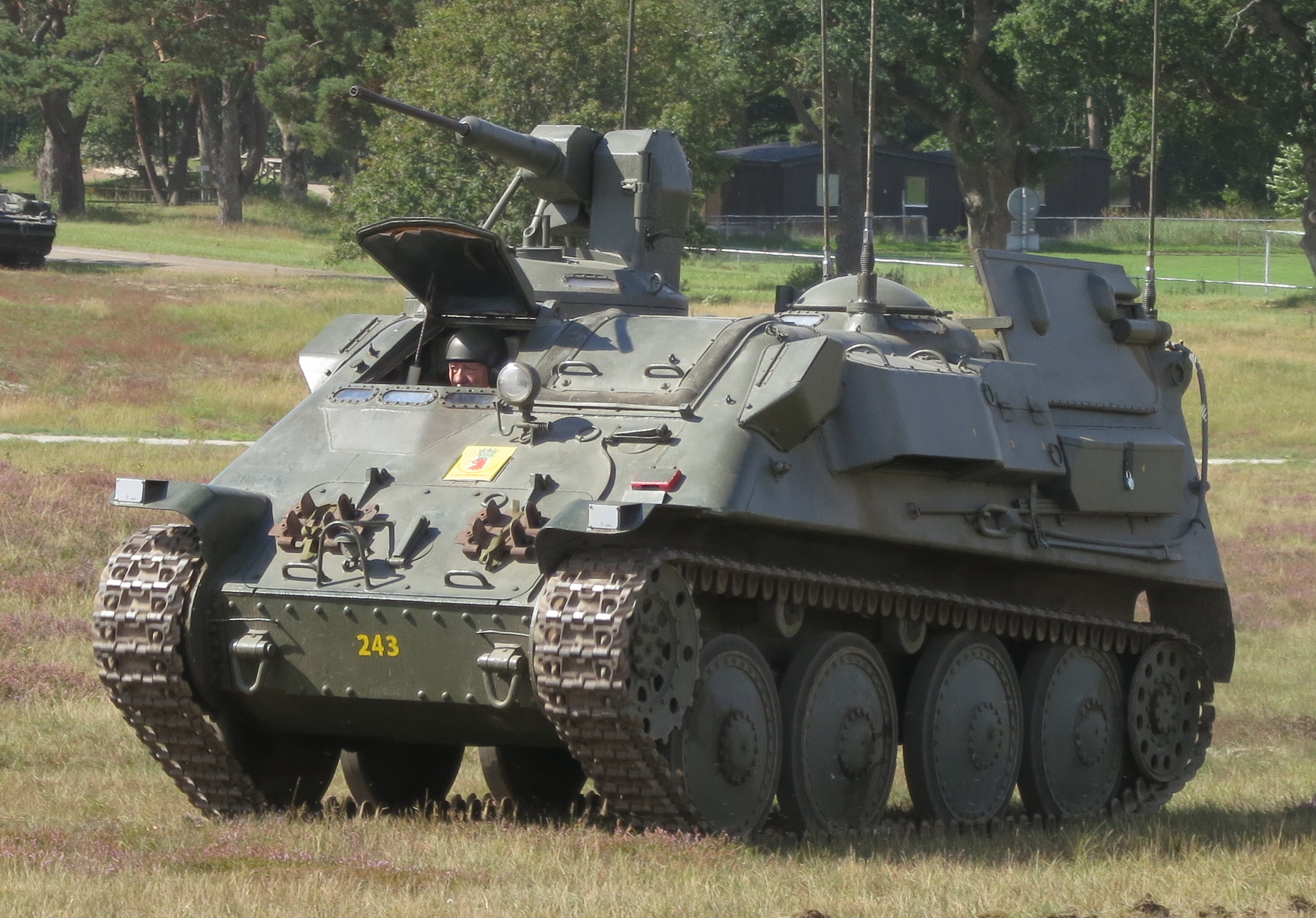
- Type: Infantry fighting vehicle
- Place of origin: Sweden

Service history
- In service: 1961–1971

Production history
- Variants: slpbv 3011, epbv 3012

Specifications
- Mass: 11.7 t (11.5 long tons; 12.9 short tons)
- Length: 4.66 m (15 ft 3 in)
- Width: 2.23 m (7 ft 4 in)
- Height: 2.64 m (8 ft 8 in)
- Crew: 2 (commander/gunner, driver) + 8 (passengers)
- Armor: 8–50 mm (upper front: 20 mm at 55°)
- Main armament: 1 × 20 mm akan m/45B with 450 rounds total
- Secondary armament: 1 × 6.5 mm ksp m/58A mount 1 × 8,4 cm grg m/48 mount with 9 rounds
- Engine: Svenska Flygmotor B44 gasoline 160 hp (120 kW)
- Power/weight: 13.68 hp/tonne
- Suspension: Leaf spring
- Operational range: 300 km (190 mi)
- Maximum speed: 45 km/h (28 mph)

Pansarbandvagn 301 (pbv 301), meaning roughly "armoured tracked carrier vehicle 301", (Note: Pansarbandvagn directly translates to armor track wagon. The term bandvagn, even though it translates to track wagon, is a Swedish military term used to describe tracked multipurpose carrier type vehicles. Tracked vehicles designed for more specialized combat roles, like tanks etc (stridsvagn), are instead only called wagons (chassis description) to denote that they are tracked but more specialized and less universal.) was a Swedish infantry fighting vehicle (Pansarskyttefordon) used by the Swedish Army. It was designed to carry a squad of 8 fully armed panzergrenadiers (pansarskyttesoldater) into battle and provide direct-fire support for them in combat. The panzergrenadiers could opt to either fight from inside the vehicle through hatches on the roof or dismount the vehicle and fight in its vicinity.

== Design ==
The pbv 301 was armed with a Bofors 20 mm (0.8 in) L/70 aircraft gun taken from scrapped Saab 21 fighter aircraft, mounted in an oscillating housing above a rotating cupola. It was fed from 75 round belts stored inside the vehicle, with 450 rounds total. Inside the vehicle were mountings for a variety of infantry weapons and munitions, such as an FN MAG and a Carl Gustaf 8.4 cm recoilless rifle with 9 rounds.

The pbv 301 was an interim solution, built on the chassis from the obsolete stridsvagn m/41 tank (which in turn is the licensed variant of the Czechoslovak THN/LT vz. 38), in service since 1942. It was introduced in 1961 and removed from service in the late 1960s and early 1970s when the replacement pbv 302 came into use. The pbv 301 replaced the open-topped terrängbil m/42 KP IFV as the main infantry fighting vehicle of the Swedish Army.

== Images ==
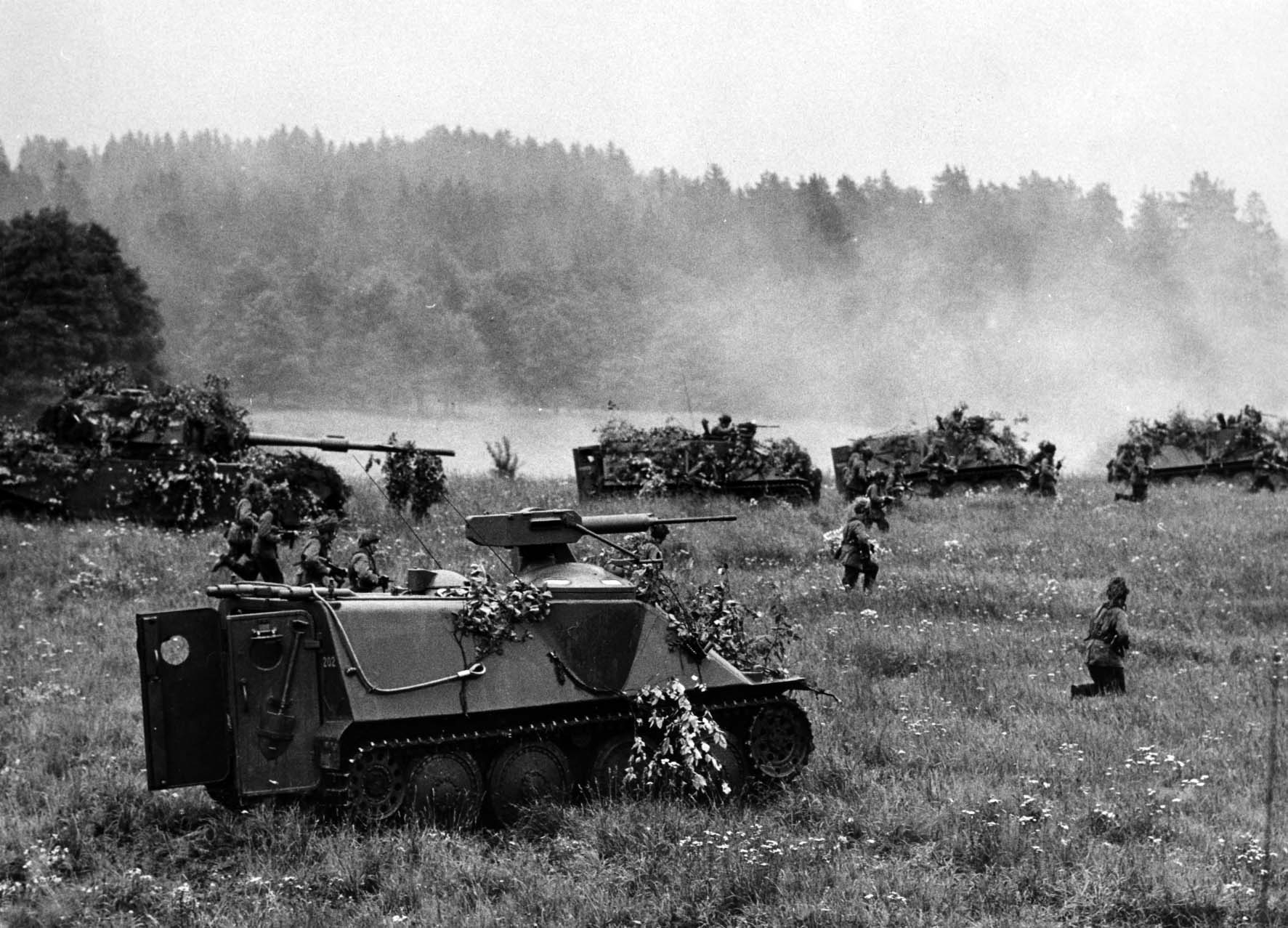
A Pbv 301 with dismounted infantry

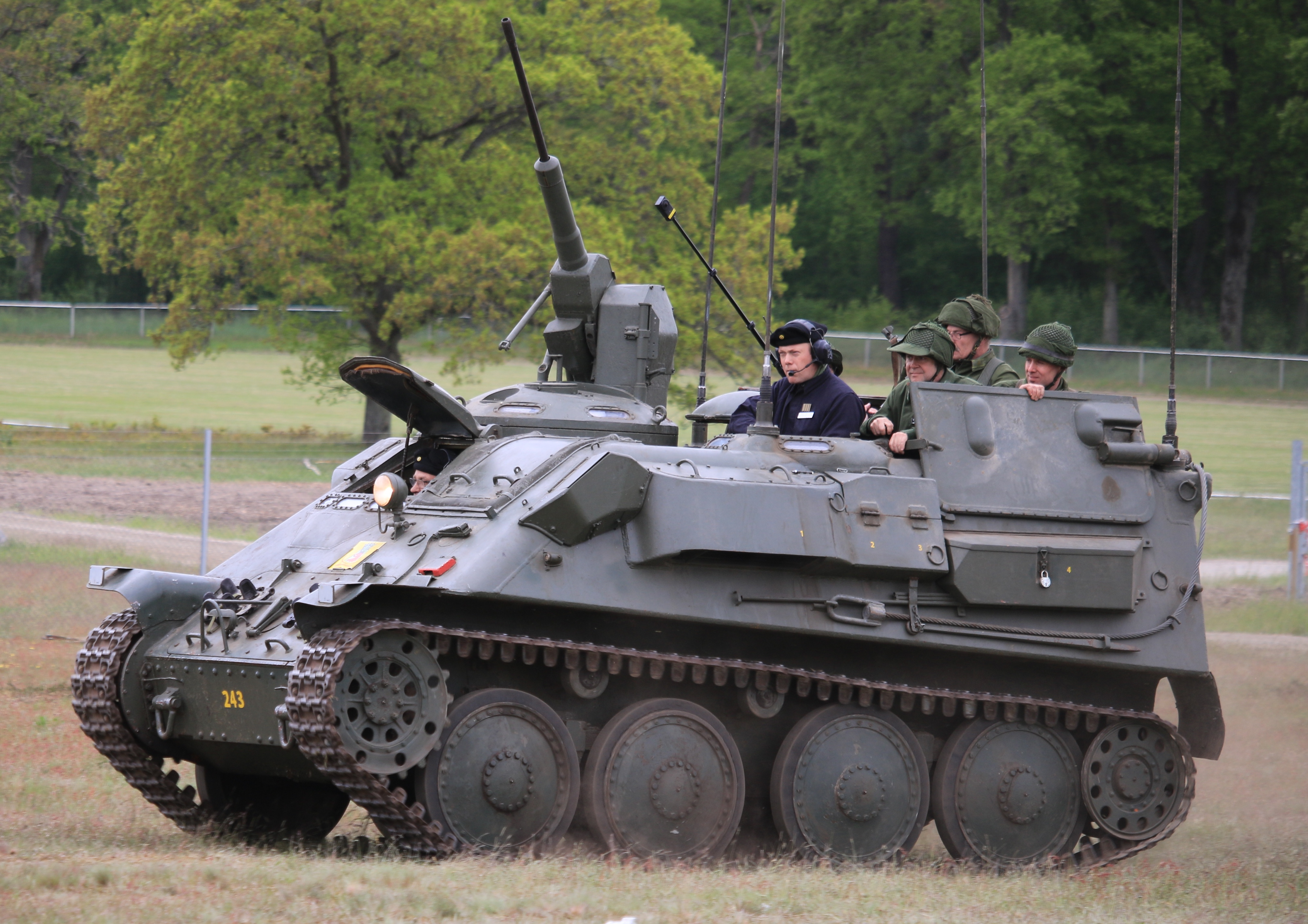
A Pbv 301 with mounted infantry

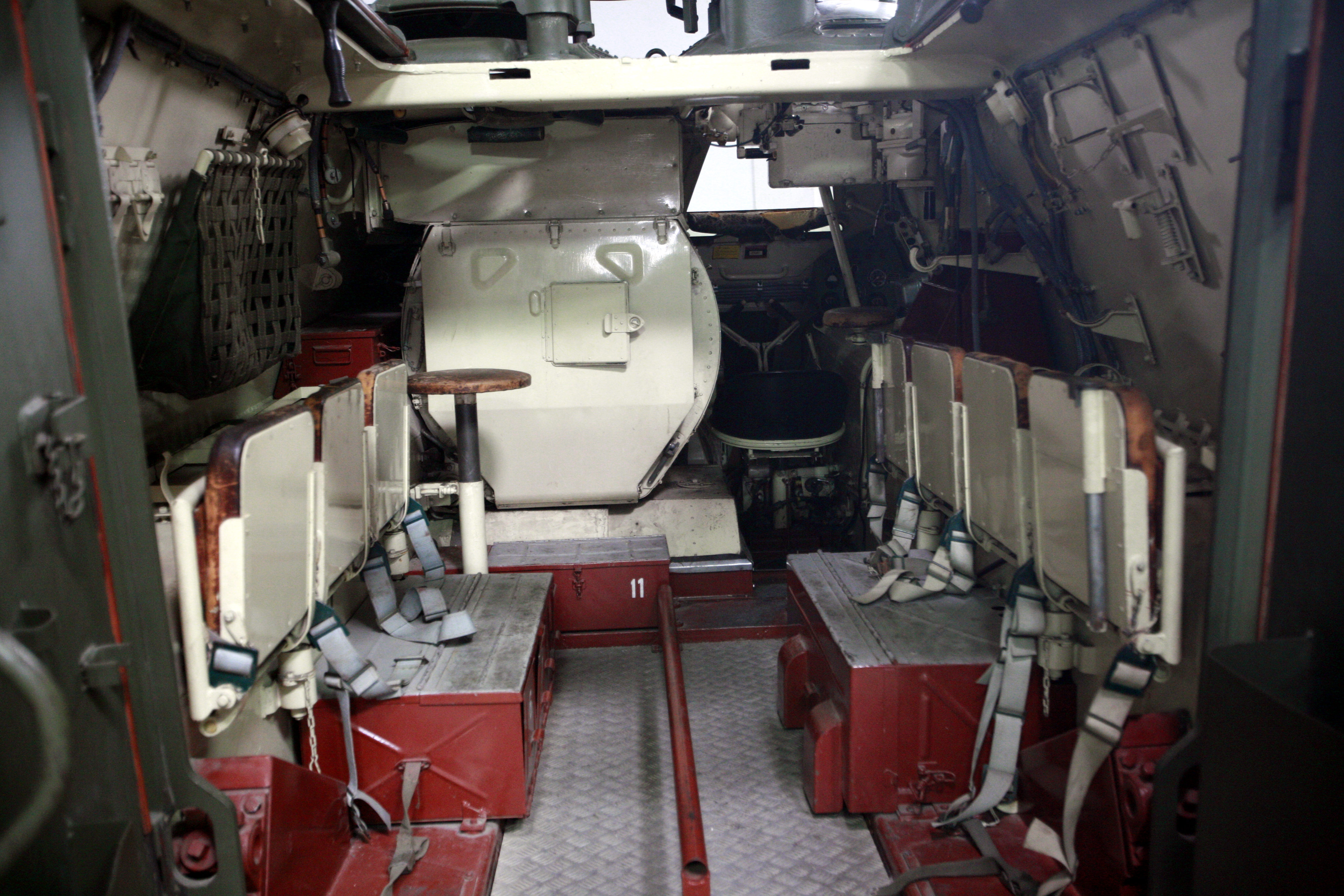
The interior of a Pbv 301

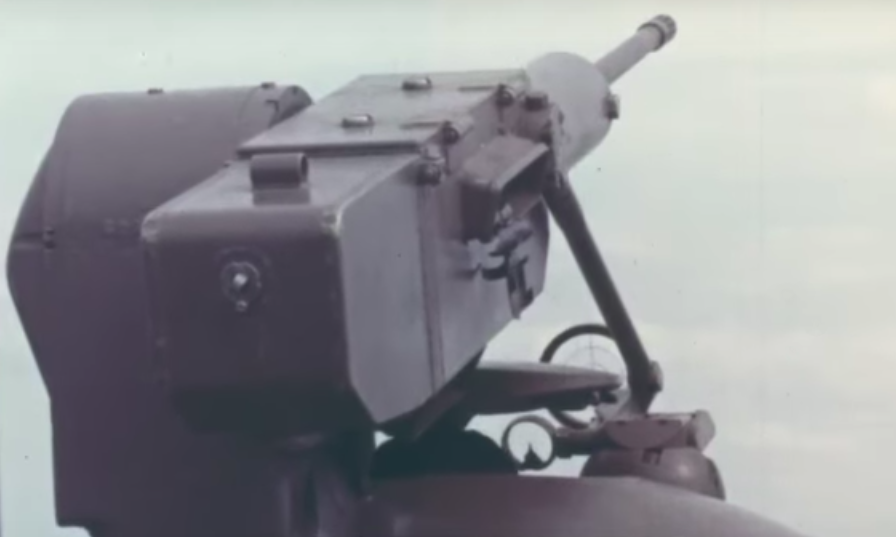
Pbv 301 20 mm cannon cupola

== Variants ==
- Pansarbandvagn 301 - Infantry fighting vehicle version, 185 produced
- Stridsledningspansarbandvagn 3011 (slpbv 3011) - Command version, 20 produced
- Eldledningspansarbandvagn 3012 (epbv 3012) - Artillery observer version, 15 produced

== Sources ==
- "Pbv 301". ointres.se.
- "BOFORS 20mm AUTOMATIC GUN for ARMORED PERSONNEL CARRIERS 49114". youtube.com. Archived from the original on 2021-12-19.
- Pbv 301 beskrivning, fastställd 8/7 1965 (in Swedish). Royal Swedish Army Ordnance Administration. 1965-07-08.
