= Stormartillerivagn m/43 =

Sav m/43
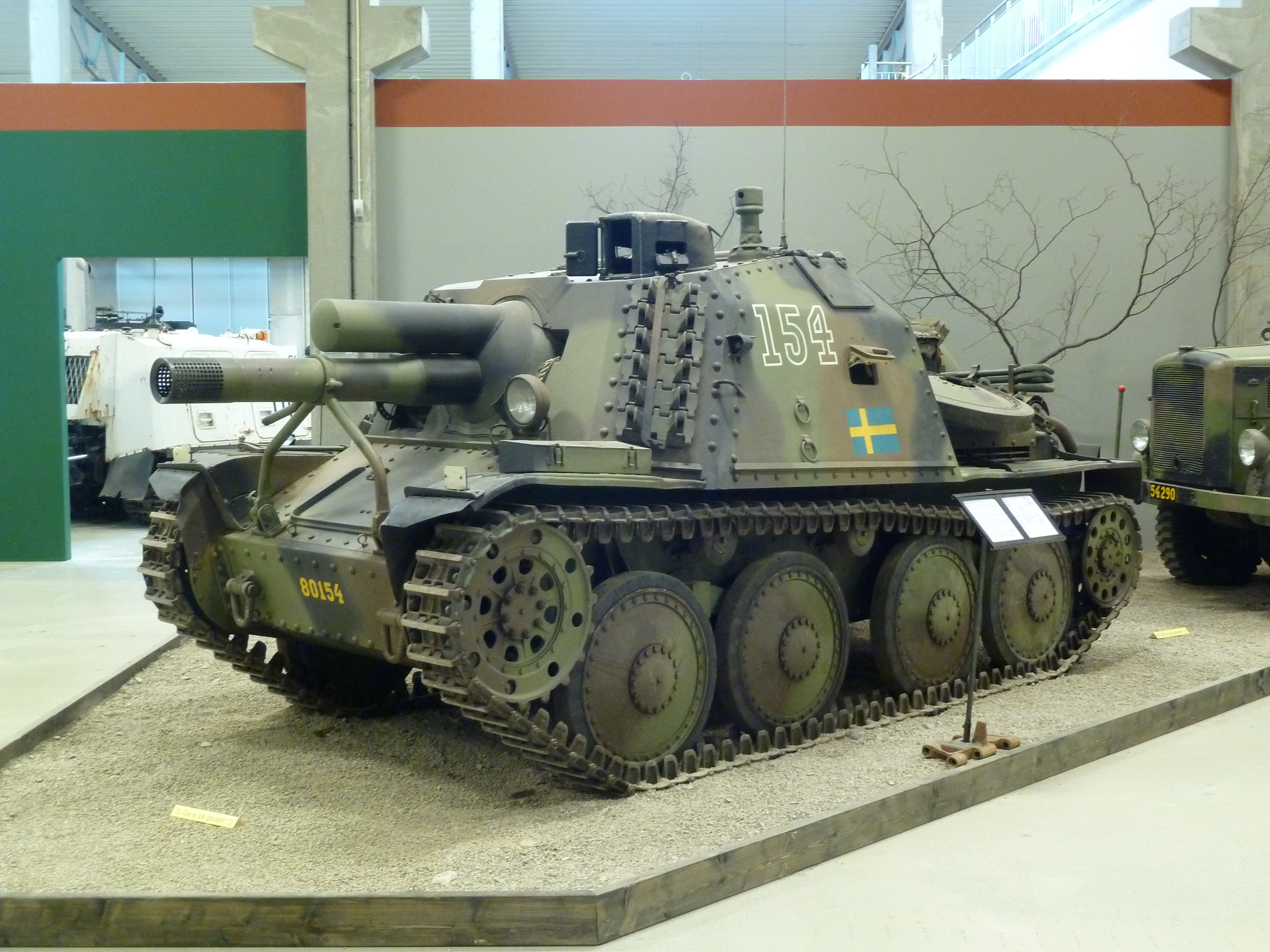
- Type: Assault gun
- Place of origin: Sweden

Service history
- In service: 1944–1973
- Used by: Sweden

Production history
- Manufacturer: Scania-Vabis
- Produced: 1944–1947
- No. built: 36

Specifications
- Mass: 12.4 t (13.7 short tons; 12.2 long tons)
- Length: 5.05 m (16 ft 7 in)
- Width: 2.14 m (7 ft 0 in)
- Height: 2.29 m (7 ft 6 in)
- Crew: 4
- Main armament: 75 mm gun or 105 mm m/44 Bofors gun
- Engine: Scania-Vabis type 603 gasoline engine 160 hp (120 kW)
- Power/weight: 12.9 hp/tonne
- Transmission: Praga-Wilson (5 speed)
- Suspension: leaf spring
- Ground clearance: 0.4 m (16 in)
- Maximum speed: 43 km/h (27 mph)

Stormartillerivagn m/43 (Sav m/43) (English: Assault artillery carriage model 1943) was an assault gun based on Stridsvagn m/41 SII chassis, a Swedish development of a license-built Czechoslovak TNH light tank. The Sav m/43 was first armed with a 75 mm gun, which was later replaced by a 105 mm m/44 gun.

== Service ==
The Sav m/43 was used as artillery by the A9 Regiment, stationed at Kristinehamn. After World War 2, the 18 units were upgraded with Bofors 105mm guns, and an order for 18 more were placed at the end of 1945, which was completed near the end of 1947. In 1951, they were transferred to the armored forces. With one Sav m/43 used in training, they were allocated to infantry assault gun companies, with six assault guns in each brigade. They were phased out of active service in 1973.
