= Stealth technology =

Military technology to make personnel and material less visible

Stealth weapons

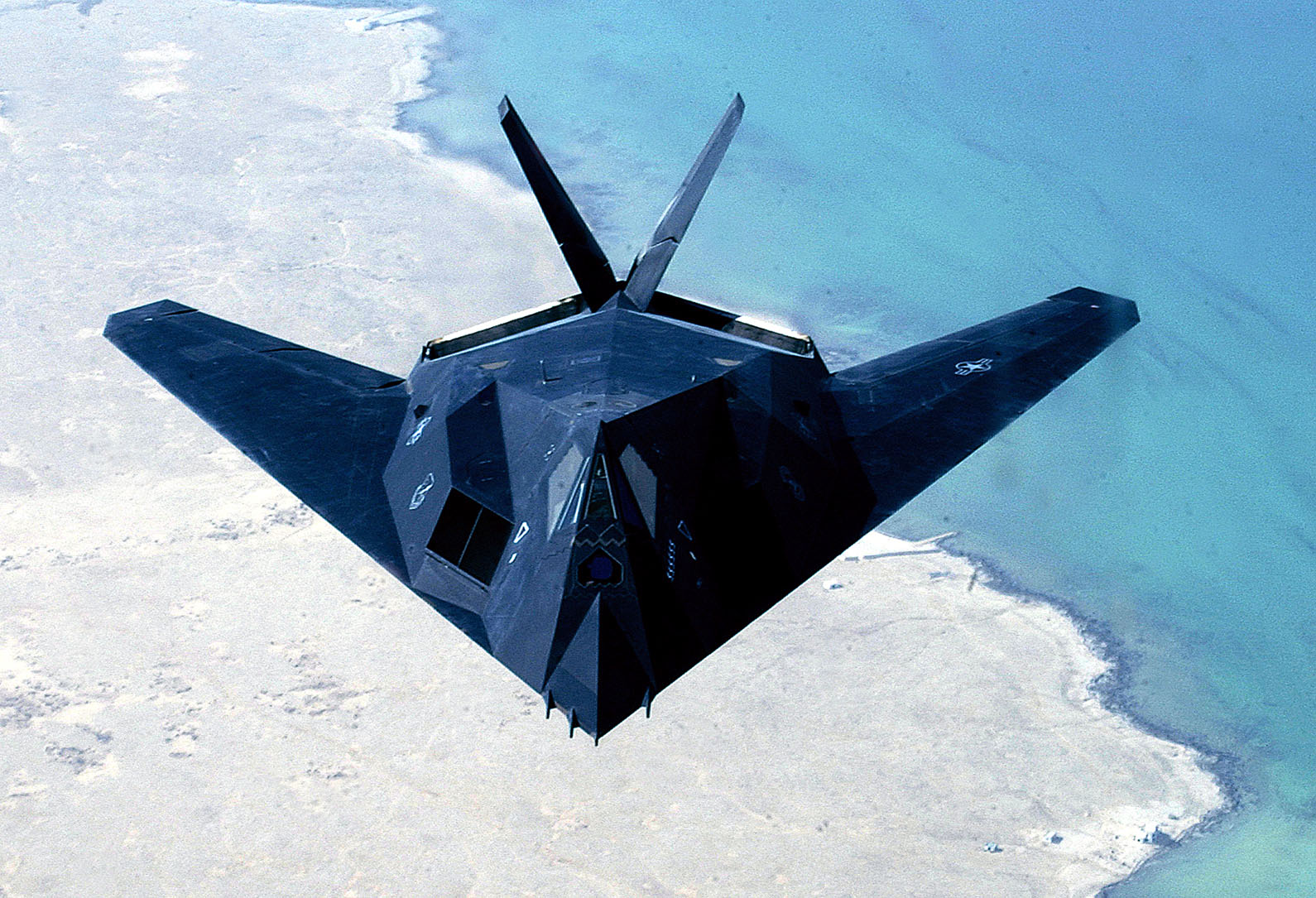
F-117 stealth aircraft

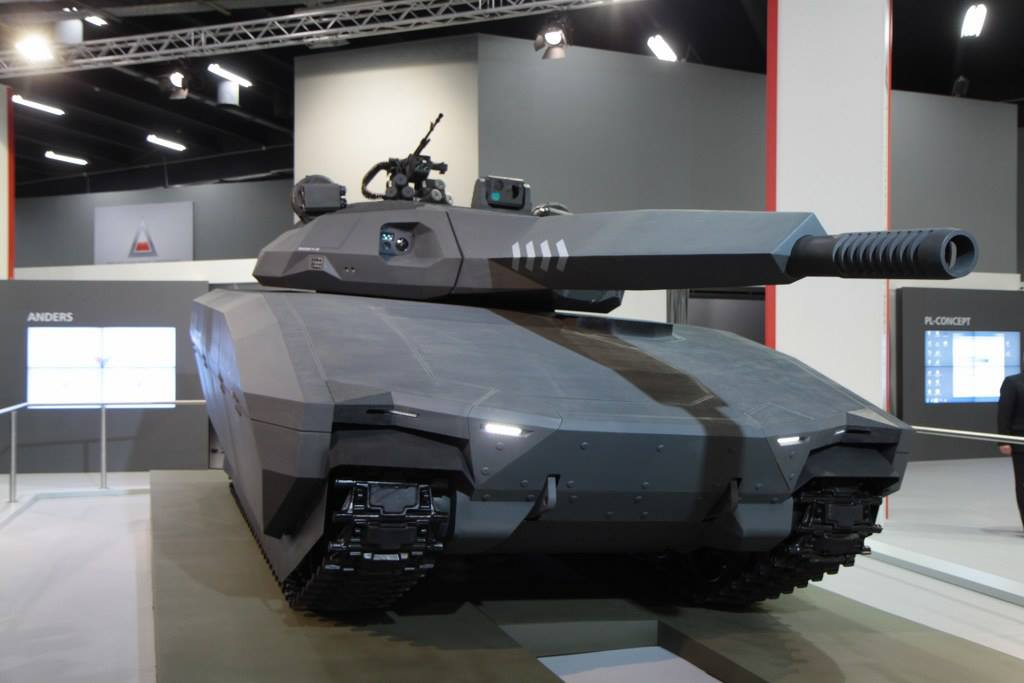
PL-01 stealth tank

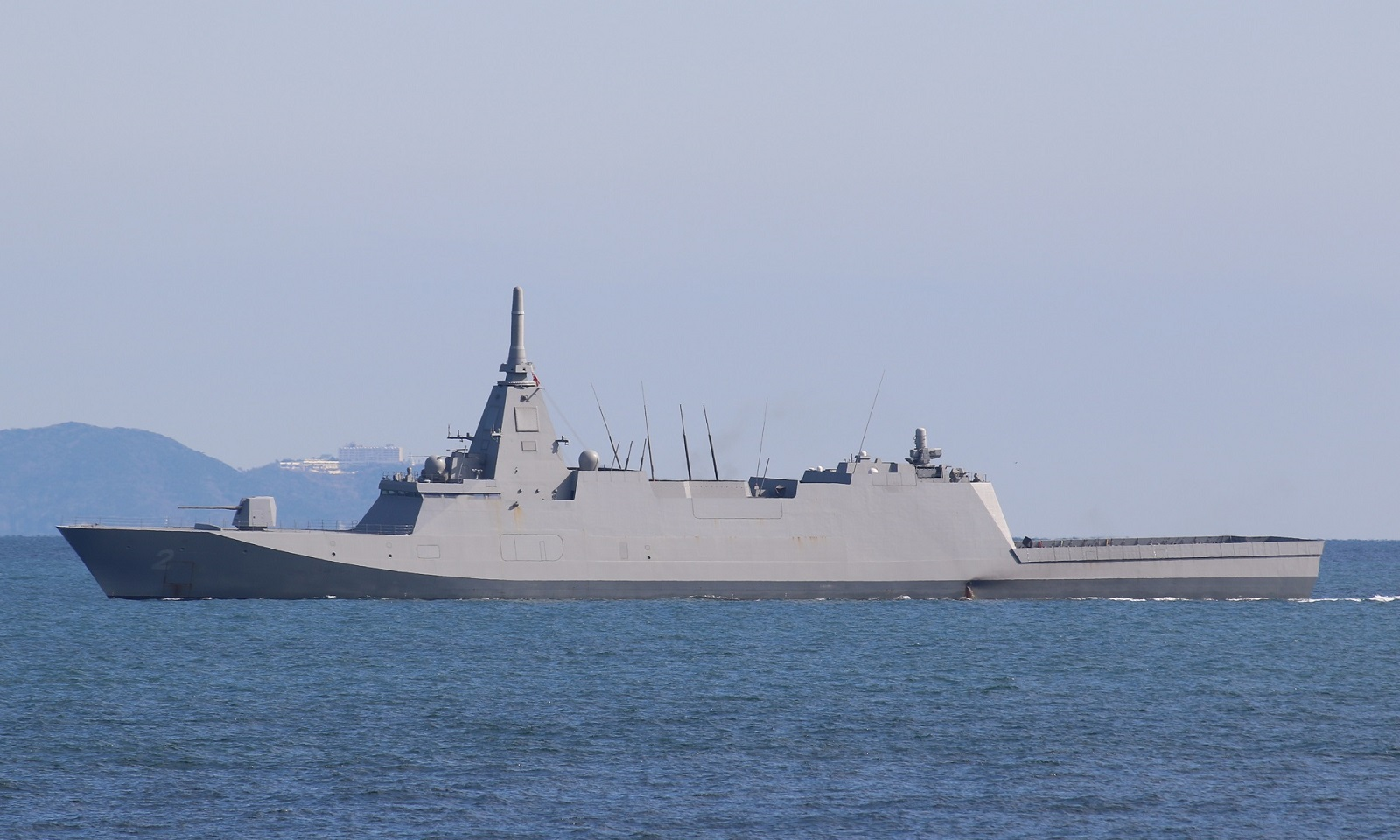
JS Kumano, a Japanese stealth frigate

Stealth technology, also termed low observable technology (LO technology), is a sub-discipline of military tactics and passive and active electronic countermeasures. The term covers a range of methods used to make personnel, aircraft, ships, submarines, missiles, satellites, and ground vehicles less visible (ideally invisible) to radar, infrared, sonar and other detection methods. It corresponds to military camouflage for these parts of the electromagnetic spectrum (i.e., multi-spectral camouflage).

Development of modern stealth technologies in the United States began in 1958, where earlier attempts to prevent radar tracking of its U-2 spy planes during the Cold War by the Soviet Union had been unsuccessful. Designers turned to developing a specific shape for planes that tended to reduce detection by redirecting electromagnetic radiation waves from radars. Radiation-absorbent material was also tested and made to reduce or block radar signals that reflect off the surfaces of aircraft. Such changes to shape and surface composition comprise stealth technology as currently used on the Northrop Grumman B-2 Spirit "Stealth Bomber".

The concept of stealth is to operate or hide from external observation. This concept was first explored through camouflage to make an object's appearance blend into the visual background. As the potency of detection and interception technologies (radar, infrared search and tracking, surface-to-air missiles, etc.) have increased, so too has the extent to which the design and operation of military personnel and vehicles have been affected in response. Some military uniforms are treated with chemicals to reduce their infrared signature. A modern stealth vehicle is designed from the outset to have a chosen spectral signature. The degree of stealth embodied in a given design is chosen according to the projected threats of detection.

== History ==
In the rugged, snow-covered terrain of the Himalayas, snow leopards (Panthera Uncia) and blue sheep (Pseudois nayaur) blend into their surroundings through coat coloration, patterning, and motionless posture. This indicates that camouflage to aid or avoid predation predates humanity, and hunters have been using vegetation to conceal themselves perhaps as long as people have been hunting. The earliest application of camouflage in warfare is impossible to ascertain. Methods for visual concealment in war were documented by Sun Tzu in his book The Art of War in the 5th century BC, and by Frontinus in his work Strategemata in the 1st century AD.

In England, irregular units of gamekeepers in the 17th century were the first to adopt drab colours (common in 16th century Irish units) as a form of camouflage, following examples from the continent.

During World War I, the Germans experimented with the use of Cellon (Cellulose acetate), a transparent covering material, in an attempt to reduce the visibility of military aircraft. Single examples of the Fokker E.III Eindecker fighter monoplane, the Albatros C.I two-seat observation biplane, and the Linke-Hofmann R.I prototype heavy bomber were covered with Cellon. However, sunlight glinting from the material made the aircraft even more visible. Cellon was also found to degrade quickly from both sunlight and in-flight temperature changes, so the effort to make transparent aircraft ceased.

In 1916, the British modified a small SS class airship for the purpose of night-time reconnaissance over German lines on the Western Front. Fitted with a silenced engine and a black gas bag, the craft was both invisible and inaudible from the ground but several night-time flights over German-held territory produced little useful intelligence and the idea was dropped.

Diffused lighting camouflage, a shipborne form of counter-illumination camouflage, was trialled by the Royal Canadian Navy from 1941 to 1943. The concept was followed up for aircraft by the Americans and the British: in 1945, a Grumman Avenger aircraft with Yehudi lights reached 3,000 yards (2,700 m) from a ship before being sighted. This ability was rendered obsolete by radar.

Chaff was invented in Britain and Germany early in World War II as a means to hide aircraft from radar. In effect, chaff acted upon radio waves much as a smoke screen acted upon visible light.

The German U-boat U-480 may have been the first stealth submarine. It featured an anechoic tile rubber coating, one layer of which contained circular air pockets to defeat ASDIC sonar. Radar-absorbent paints and materials of rubber and semiconductor composites (codenames: Sumpf, Schornsteinfeger) were used by the Kriegsmarine on submarines in World War II. Tests showed they were effective in reducing radar signatures at both short (centimetres) and long (1.5 metre) wavelengths. The Type 29 concept was the first design to use faceted sides and angled sail were similar to the F-117 stealth fighter but instead of deflecting radar waves, it was intended to deflect active sonar pings from enemy warships.

In 1956, the U.S. Central Intelligence Agency (CIA) began attempts to reduce the radar cross-section (RCS) of the U-2 spy plane. Three systems were developed, Trapeze, a series of wires and ferrite beads around the planform of the aircraft, a covering material with PCB circuitry embedded in it, and radar-absorbent paint. These were deployed in the field on the so-called dirty birds but results were disappointing, the weight and drag increases were not worth any reduction in detection rates. More successful was applying camouflage paint to the originally bare metal aircraft; a deep blue was found to be most effective. The weight of this cost 250 ft (76 m) in maximum altitude, but made the aircraft harder for interceptors to see.

In 1958, the CIA requested funding for a reconnaissance aircraft to replace the existing U-2 spy planes, and Lockheed secured contractual rights to produce it. "Kelly" Johnson and his team at Lockheed's Skunk Works were assigned to produce the A-12 (or OXCART), which operated at high altitude of 70,000 to 80,000 ft (21,000 to 24,000 m) and speed of Mach 3.2 (2,400 mph; 3,800 km/h) to avoid radar detection. Various plane shapes designed to reduce radar detection were developed in earlier prototypes, named A-1 to A-11. The A-12 included a number of stealthy features including special fuel to reduce the signature of the exhaust plume, canted vertical stabilizers, the use of composite materials in key locations, and the overall finish in radar-absorbent paint.

In 1960, the United States Air Force (USAF) reduced the radar cross-section of a Ryan Q-2C Firebee drone. This was achieved through specially designed screens over the air intake, and radiation-absorbent material on the fuselage, and radar-absorbent paint.

The United States Army issued a specification in 1968 which called for an observation aircraft that would be acoustically undetectable from the ground when flying at an altitude of 1,500 ft (460 m) at night. This resulted in the Lockheed YO-3A Quiet Star, which operated in South Vietnam from late June 1970 to September 1971.

During the 1970s, the U.S. Department of Defense launched project Lockheed Have Blue, with the aim of developing a stealth fighter. There was fierce bidding between Lockheed and Northrop to secure the multibillion-dollar contract. Lockheed incorporated into its bid a text written by the Soviet-Russian physicist Pyotr Ufimtsev from 1962, titled Method of Edge Waves in the Physical Theory of Diffraction, Soviet Radio, Moscow, 1962. In 1971, this book was translated into English with the same title by the USAF, Foreign Technology Division. The theory played a critical role in the design of American Lockheed F-117 Nighthawk and Northrop B-2 Spirit stealth aircraft. Equations outlined in the paper quantified how a plane's shape would affect its detectability by radar, the RCS. At the time, the Soviet Union did not have supercomputer capacity to solve these equations for actual designs. This was applied by Lockheed in computer simulation to design a novel shape they called the "Hopeless Diamond", a wordplay on the Hope Diamond, securing contractual rights to produce the F-117 Nighthawk starting in 1975. In 1977, Lockheed produced two 60% scale models under the Have Blue contract. The Have Blue program was a stealth technology demonstrator that lasted from 1976 to 1979. The Northrop Grumman Tacit Blue also played a part in the development of composite material and curvilinear surfaces, low observables, fly-by-wire, and other stealth technology innovations. The success of Have Blue led the USAF to create the Senior Trend program which developed the F-117.

In the early 21st century, the proliferation of stealth technology began outside of the United States. Both Russia and China tested their stealth aircraft in 2010. Russia manufactured ten flyable prototypes of the Sukhoi Su-57, while China produced two stealth aircraft, Chengdu J-20 and Shenyang FC-31. In 2017, China became the second country in the world to field an operational stealth aircraft, challenging the United States and its Asian allies.

== Principles ==
Stealth technology (or LO for low observability) is not one technology. It is a set of technologies, used in combinations, that can greatly reduce the distances at which a person or vehicle can be detected; more so radar cross-section reductions, but also acoustic, thermal, and other aspects.

== Radar cross-section (RCS) reductions ==
Almost since the invention of radar, various methods have been tried to minimize detection. Rapid development of radar during World War II led to equally rapid development of numerous counter radar measures during the period; a notable example of this was the use of chaff. Modern methods include radar jamming and deception.

The term stealth in reference to reduced radar signature aircraft became popular during the late 1980s when the Lockheed Martin F-117 stealth fighter became widely known. The first large scale (and public) use of the F-117 was during the Gulf War in 1991. However, F-117A stealth fighters were used for the first time in combat during Operation Just Cause, the United States invasion of Panama in 1989. Stealth aircraft are often designed to have radar cross sections that are orders of magnitude smaller than conventional aircraft. The radar range equation meant that all else being equal, detection range is proportional to the fourth root of RCS; thus, reducing detection range by a factor of 10 requires a reduction of RCS by a factor of 10,000.

=== Vehicle shape ===
==== Aircraft ====
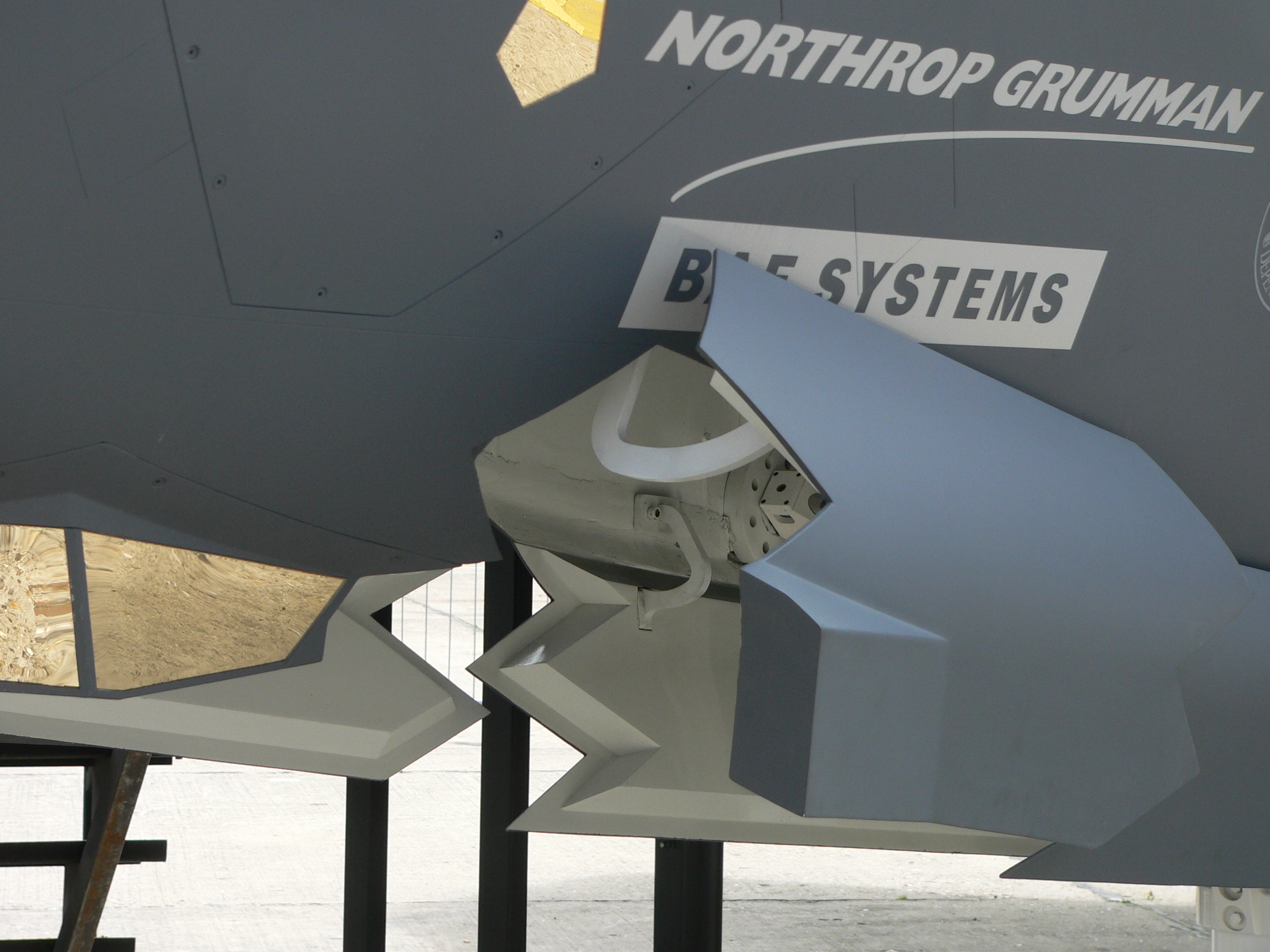
The F-35 Lightning II offers better stealthy features (such as this landing gear door) than prior American multi-role fighters, such as the F-16 Fighting Falcon

The possibility of designing aircraft in such a manner as to reduce their radar cross-section was recognized in the late 1930s, when the first radar tracking systems were employed, and it has been known since at least the 1960s that aircraft shape makes a significant difference in detectability. The Avro Vulcan, a British bomber of the 1960s, had a remarkably small appearance on microwave radio frequency radar despite its large size, and occasionally disappeared from radar screens entirely. It is now known that it had a fortuitously stealthy shape apart from the vertical element of the tail. Despite being designed before a low RCS and other stealth factors were ever a consideration, a Royal Aircraft Establishment technical note of 1957 stated that of all the aircraft so far studied, the Vulcan appeared by far the simplest radar echoing object, due to its shape: only one or two components contributing significantly to the echo at any aspect (one of them being the vertical stabilizer, which is especially relevant for side aspect RCS), compared with three or more on most other types. While writing about radar systems, authors Simon Kingsley and Shaun Quegan singled out the Vulcan's shape as acting to reduce the RCS. In contrast, the Tupolev Tu-95 Russian long-range bomber (NATO reporting name 'Bear') was conspicuous on radar. It is now known that propellers and jet turbine blades produce a bright radar image; the Bear has four pairs of large 18-foot (5.6 m) diameter contra-rotating propellers.

Another important factor is internal construction. Some stealth aircraft have skin that is radar transparent or absorbing, behind which are structures termed reentrant triangles. Radar waves penetrating the skin get trapped in these structures, reflecting off the internal faces and losing energy. This method was first used on the Lockheed Blackbird series: A-12, YF-12A, and SR-71.

The most efficient way to reflect radar waves back to the emitting radar is with orthogonal metal plates, forming a corner reflector consisting of either a dihedral (two plates) or a trihedral (three orthogonal plates). This configuration occurs in the tail of a conventional aircraft, where the vertical and horizontal components of the tail are set at right angles. Stealth aircraft such as the F-117 use a different arrangement, tilting the tail surfaces to reduce corner reflections formed between them. A more radical method is to omit the tail, as in the B-2 Spirit. The B-2's clean, low-drag flying wing configuration gives it exceptional range and reduces its radar profile. The flying wing design most closely resembles a so-called infinite flat plate (as vertical control surfaces dramatically increase RCS), the perfect stealth shape, as it would have no angles to reflect back radar waves.

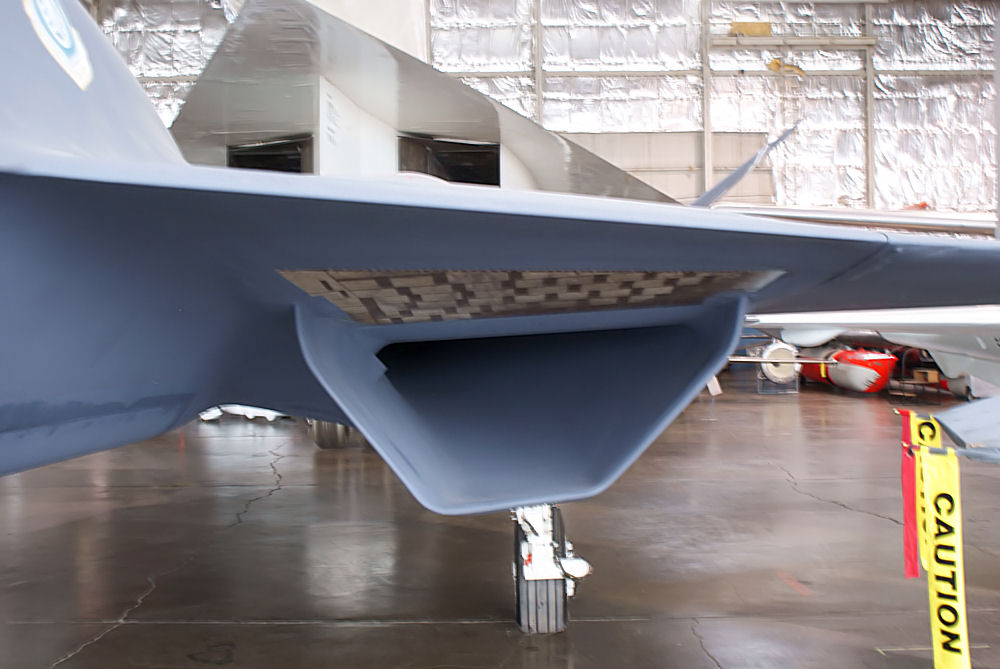
YF-23 S-duct engine air intake conceals engine from probing radar waves

In addition to altering the tail, stealth design must bury the engines within the wing or fuselage, or in some cases where stealth is applied to an extant aircraft, install baffles in the air intakes, so that the compressor blades are not visible to radar. A stealthy shape must be devoid of complex bumps or protrusions of any kind, meaning that weapons, fuel tanks, and other stores must not be carried externally. Any stealthy vehicle becomes un-stealthy when a door or hatch opens.

Parallel alignment of edges or even surfaces is also often used in stealth designs. The technique involves using a small number of edge orientations in the shape of the structure. For example, on the F-22A Raptor, the leading edges of the wing and the tail planes are set at the same angle. Other smaller structures, such as the air intake bypass doors and the air refueling aperture, also use the same angles. The effect of this is to return a narrow radar signal in a very specific direction away from the radar emitter rather than returning a diffuse signal detectable at many angles. The effect is sometimes called "glitter" after the very brief signal seen when the reflected beam passes across a detector. It can be difficult for the radar operator to distinguish between a glitter event and a digital glitch in the processing system.

Stealth airframes sometimes display distinctive serrations on some exposed edges, such as the engine ports. The YF-23 has such serrations on the exhaust ports. This is another example in the parallel alignment of features, this time on the external airframe.

The shaping requirements detracted greatly from the F-117's aerodynamic properties. It is inherently unstable, and cannot be flown without a fly-by-wire control system.

Similarly, coating the cockpit canopy with a thin film transparent conductor (vapor-deposited gold or indium tin oxide) helps to reduce the aircraft's radar profile, because radar waves would normally enter the cockpit, reflect off objects (the inside of a cockpit has a complex shape, with a pilot helmet alone forming a sizeable return), and possibly return to the radar, but the conductive coating creates a controlled shape that deflects the incoming radar waves away from the radar. The coating is thin enough that it has no adverse effect on pilot vision.

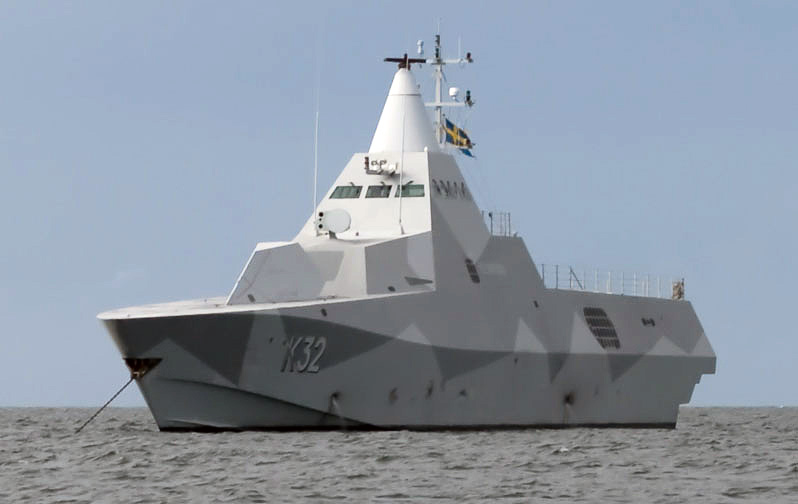
HSwMS Helsingborg, a stealth ship

==== Ships ====
Ships have also adopted similar methods. Though the earlier American Arleigh Burke-class destroyers incorporated some signature-reduction features. the Norwegian Skjold-class corvettes was the first coastal defence and the French La Fayette-class frigates the first ocean-going stealth ships to enter service. Other examples are the Dutch De Zeven Provinciën-class frigates, the Taiwanese Tuo Chiang-class corvettes, German Sachsen-class frigates, the Swedish Visby-class corvette, the American San Antonio-class amphibious transport docks, and most modern warship designs.

=== Materials ===
==== Non-metallic airframe ====
Dielectric composite materials are more transparent to radar, whereas electrically conductive materials such as metals and carbon fibers reflect electromagnetic energy incident on the material's surface. Composites may also contain ferrites to optimize the dielectric and magnetic properties of a material for its application.

==== Radar-absorbent material ====
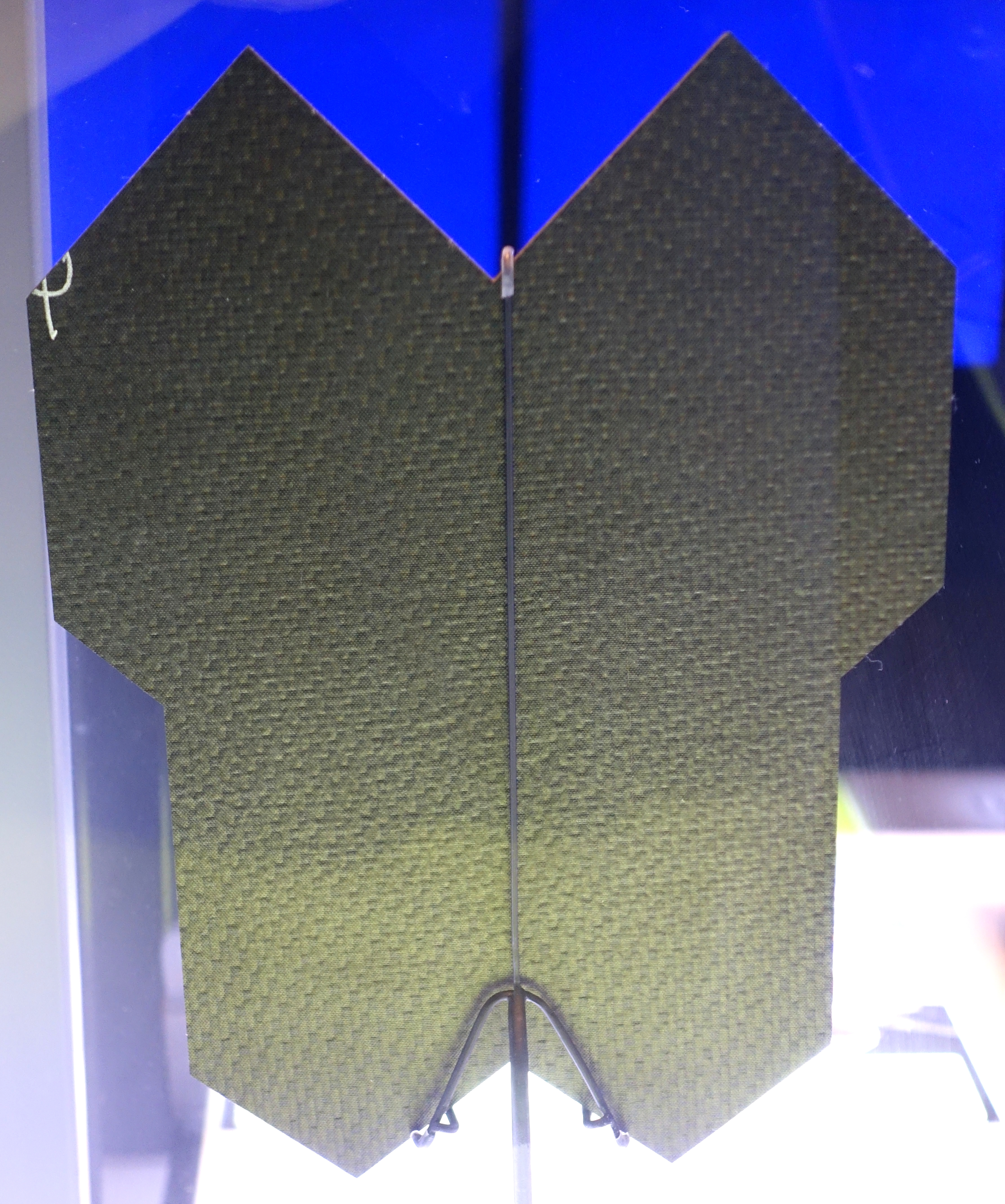
Skin of a B-2 bomber.

Radiation-absorbent material (RAM), often as paints, are used especially on the edges of metal surfaces. While the material and thickness of RAM coatings can vary, the way they work is the same: absorb radiated energy from a ground- or air-based radar station into the coating and convert it to heat rather than reflect it back. Current technologies include dielectric composites and metal fibers containing ferrite isotopes. Ceramic composite coating is a new type of material systems which can sustain at higher temperatures with better sand erosion resistance and thermal resistance. Paint comprises depositing pyramid-like colonies on the reflecting superficies with the gaps filled with ferrite-based RAM. The pyramidal structure deflects the incident radar energy in the maze of RAM. One commonly used material is called iron ball paint. It contains microscopic iron spheres that resonate in tune with incoming radio waves and dissipate most of their energy as heat, leaving little to reflect back to detectors. FSS are planar periodic structures that behave like filters to electromagnetic energy. The considered frequency-selective surfaces are composed of conducting patch elements pasted on the ferrite layer. FSS are used for filtration and microwave absorption.

=== Radar stealth countermeasures and limits ===
==== Low-frequency radar ====
Shaping offers far fewer stealth advantages against low-frequency radar. If the radar wavelength is roughly twice the size of the target, a half-wave resonance effect can still generate a significant return. However, low-frequency radar is limited by lack of available frequencies (many are heavily used by other systems), by lack of accuracy of the diffraction-limited systems given their long wavelengths, and by the radar's size, making it difficult to transport. A long-wave radar may detect a target and roughly locate it, but not provide enough information to identify it, target it with weapons, or even to guide a fighter to it.

==== Multiple emitters ====
Stealth aircraft attempt to minimize all radar reflections, but are specifically designed to avoid reflecting radar waves back in the direction they came from (since in most cases a radar emitter and receiver are in the same location). They are less able to minimize radar reflections in other directions. Thus, detection can be better achieved if emitters are in different locations from receivers. One emitter separate from one receiver is termed bistatic radar; one or more emitters separate from more than one receiver is termed multistatic radar. Proposals exist to use reflections from emitters such as civilian radio transmitters, including cellular telephone radio towers.

==== Moore's law ====
By Moore's law the processing power behind radar systems is rising over time. This will eventually erode the ability of physical stealth to hide vehicles.

==== Ship wakes and spray ====
Synthetic aperture sidescan radars can be used to detect the location and heading of ships from their wake patterns. These are detectable from orbit. When a ship moves through a seaway it throws up a cloud of spray which can be detected by radar.

== Acoustics ==
Acoustic stealth plays a primary role for submarines and ground vehicles. Submarines use extensive rubber mountings to isolate, damp, and avoid mechanical noises that can reveal locations to underwater passive sonar arrays.

Early stealth observation aircraft used slow-turning propellers to avoid being heard by enemy troops below. Although subsonic flight is preferable to supersonic when maximizing acoustic stealth (due to the avoidance of sonic booms), supersonic jet-powered stealth aircraft like the F-22 still remain viable, as they rely mostly on their radar and thermal stealth.

One method to reduce helicopter rotor noise is modulated blade spacing. Standard rotor blades are evenly spaced, and produce greater noise at a given frequency and its harmonics. Using varied spacing between the blades spreads the noise or acoustic signature of the rotor over a greater range of frequencies.

== Visibility ==
The simplest technology is visual camouflage; the use of paint or other materials to color and break up the lines of a vehicle or person.

Most stealth aircraft use matte paint and dark colors, and operate only at night. Lately, interest in daylight Stealth (especially by the USAF) has emphasized the use of gray paint in disruptive schemes, and it is assumed that Yehudi lights could be used in the future to hide the airframe (against the background of the sky, including at night, aircraft of any colour appear dark) or as a sort of active camouflage. The original B-2 design had wing tanks for a contrail-inhibiting chemical, but this was replaced in the final design with a contrail sensor that alerts the pilot when he should change altitude and mission planning also considers altitudes where the probability of their formation is minimized.

In space, mirrored surfaces can be employed to reflect views of empty space toward known or suspected observers; this approach is compatible with several radar stealth schemes. Careful control of the orientation of the satellite relative to the observers is essential, and mistakes can lead to detectability enhancement rather than the desired reduction.

== Infrared ==
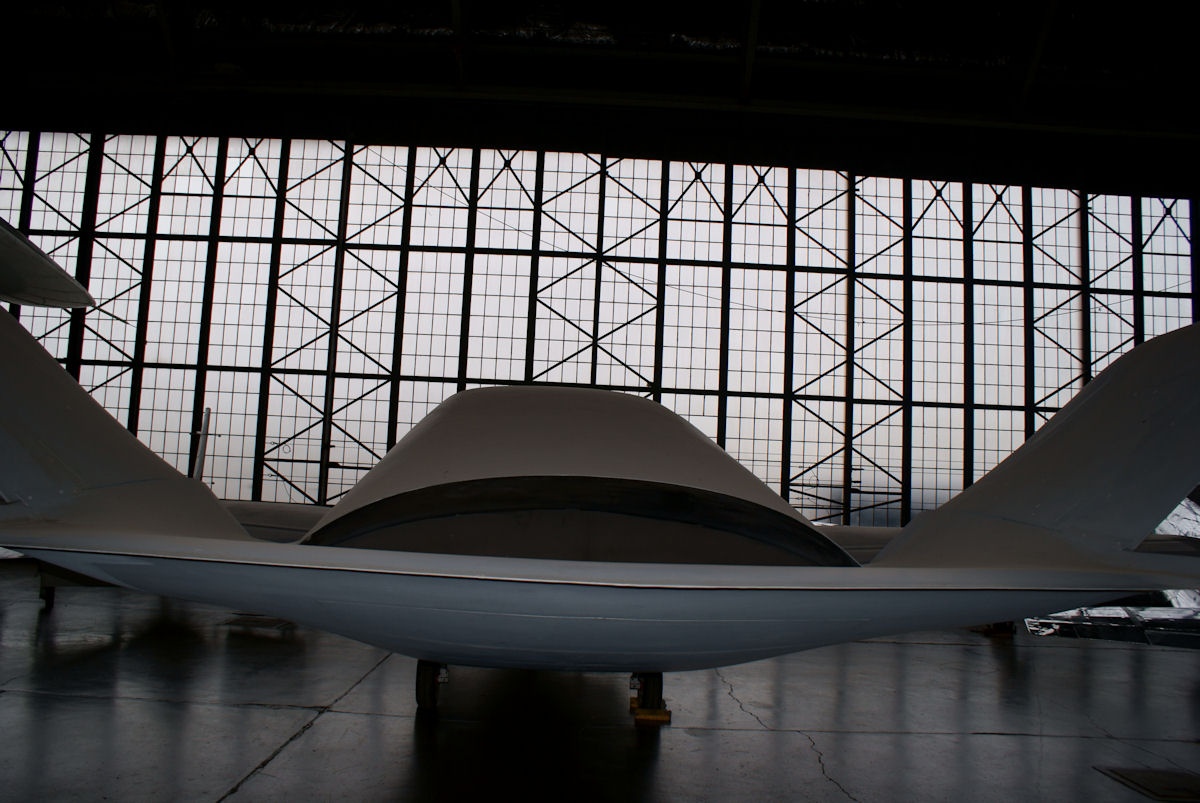
Slit shaped tail exhaust Northrop Tacit Blue

An exhaust plume contributes a significant infrared signature. One means to reduce IR signature is to have a non-circular tail pipe (a slit shape) to minimize the exhaust cross sectional area and maximize the mixing of hot exhaust with cool ambient air (see Lockheed F-117 Nighthawk, rectangular nozzles on the Lockheed Martin F-22 Raptor, and serrated nozzle flaps on the Lockheed Martin F-35 Lightning II). Often, cool air is deliberately injected into the exhaust flow to boost this process (see Ryan AQM-91 Firefly and Northrop B-2 Spirit). The Stefan–Boltzmann law shows how this results in less energy (Thermal radiation in infrared spectrum) being released and thus reduces the heat signature. In some aircraft, the jet exhaust is vented above the wing surface to shield it from observers below, as in the Lockheed F-117 Nighthawk, and the unstealthy Fairchild Republic A-10 Thunderbolt II. To achieve infrared stealth, the exhaust gas is cooled to the temperatures where the brightest wavelengths it radiates are absorbed by atmospheric carbon dioxide and water vapor, greatly reducing the infrared visibility of the exhaust plume. Another way to reduce the exhaust temperature is to circulate coolant fluids such as fuel inside the exhaust pipe, where the fuel tanks serve as heat sinks cooled by the flow of air along the wings.

Ground combat includes the use of both active and passive infrared sensors. Thus, the United States Marine Corps (USMC) ground combat uniform requirements document specifies infrared reflective quality standards.

== Reducing radio frequency (RF) emissions ==
In addition to reducing infrared and acoustic emissions, a stealth vehicle must avoid radiating any other detectable energy, such as from onboard radars, communications systems, or RF leakage from electronics enclosures. The F-117 uses passive infrared and low light level television sensor systems to aim its weapons and the F-22 Raptor has an advanced LPI radar which can illuminate enemy aircraft without triggering a radar warning receiver response.

== Measuring ==
The size of a target's image on radar is measured by the RCS, often represented by the symbol σ and expressed in square meters. This does not equal geometric area. A perfectly conducting sphere of projected cross sectional area 1 m^{2} (11 ft^{2}) (i.e. a diameter of 1.13 m (3.7 ft)) will have an RCS of 1 m^{2} (11 ft^{2}). Note that for radar wavelengths much less than the diameter of the sphere, RCS is independent of frequency. Conversely, a square flat plate of area 1 m^{2} (11 ft^{2}) will have an RCS of 𝜎 = 4π A^{2}/𝜆^{2} (where A=area, 𝜆=wavelength), or 13,982 m^{2} (150,500 ft^{2}) at 10 GHz if the radar is perpendicular to the flat surface. At off-normal incident angles, energy is reflected away from the receiver, reducing the RCS. Modern stealth aircraft are said to have an RCS comparable with small birds or large insects, though this varies widely depending on aircraft and radar.

If the RCS was directly related to the target's cross-sectional area, the only way to reduce it would be to make the physical profile smaller. Rather, by reflecting much of the radiation away or by absorbing it, the target achieves a smaller radar cross section.

== Tactics ==
Stealthy strike aircraft such as the Lockheed F-117 Nighthawk, are usually used against heavily defended enemy sites such as command and control centers or surface-to-air missile (SAM) batteries. Enemy radar will cover the airspace around these sites with overlapping coverage, making undetected entry by conventional aircraft nearly impossible. Stealthy aircraft can also be detected, but only at short ranges around the radars; for a stealthy aircraft there are substantial gaps in the radar coverage. Thus a stealthy aircraft flying an appropriate route can remain undetected by radar. Even if a stealth aircraft is detected, fire-control radars operating in C, X and Ku bands cannot paint (for missile guidance) low observable (LO) jets except at very close ranges. Many ground-based radars exploit Doppler filter to improve sensitivity to objects having a radial velocity component relative to the radar. Mission planners use their knowledge of enemy radar locations and the RCS pattern of the aircraft to design a flight path that minimizes radial speed while presenting the lowest-RCS aspects of the aircraft to the threat radar. To be able to fly these "safe" routes, it is necessary to understand an enemy's radar coverage (see electronic intelligence). Airborne or mobile radar systems such as airborne early warning and control (AEW&C, AWACS) can complicate tactical strategy for stealth operation.

== Research ==
After the invention of electromagnetic metasurfaces, the conventional means to reduce RCS have been improved significantly. As mentioned earlier, the main objective in purpose shaping is to redirect scattered waves away from the backscattered direction, which is usually the source. However, this usually compromises aerodynamic performance. One feasible solution, which has extensively been explored in recent time, is to use metasurfaces which can redirect scattered waves without altering the geometry of a target. Such metasurfaces can primarily be classified in two categories: checkerboard metasurfaces, and gradient index metasurfaces. Similarly, negative index metamaterials are artificial structures for which refractive index has a negative value for some frequency range, such as in microwave, infrared, or possibly optical. These offer another way to reduce detectability, and may provide electromagnetic near-invisibility in designed wavelengths.

Plasma stealth is a phenomenon proposed to use ionized gas, termed a plasma, to reduce RCS of vehicles. Interactions between electromagnetic radiation and ionized gas have been studied extensively for many purposes, including concealing vehicles from radar. Various methods might form a layer or cloud of plasma around a vehicle to deflect or absorb radar, from simpler electrostatic to radio frequency (RF) more complex laser discharges, but these may be difficult in practice.

Several technology research and development efforts exist to integrate the functions of aircraft flight control systems such as ailerons, elevators, elevons, flaps, and flaperons into wings to perform the aerodynamic purpose with the advantages of lower RCS for stealth, via simpler geometries and lower complexity (mechanically simpler, fewer or no moving parts or surfaces, less maintenance), and lower mass, cost (up to 50% less), drag (up to 15% less during use), and inertia (for faster, stronger control response to change vehicle orientation to reduce detection). Two promising approaches are flexible wings, and fluidics.

In flexible wings, much or all of a wing surface can change shape in flight to deflect air flow. Adaptive compliant wings are a military and commercial effort. The X-53 Active Aeroelastic Wing was a US Air Force, Boeing, and NASA effort.

In fluidics, fluid injection into airflows is being researched for use in aircraft to control direction, in two ways: circulation control and thrust vectoring. In both, larger more complex mechanical parts are replaced by smaller, simpler, lower mass fluidic systems, in which larger forces in fluids are diverted by smaller jets or flows of fluid intermittently, to change the direction of vehicles. Mechanical control surfaces that must move cause an important part of aircraft radar cross-section. Omitting mechanical control surfaces can reduce radar returns. As of 2023, at least two countries are known to be researching fluidic control. In Britain, BAE Systems has tested two fluidically controlled unmanned aircraft, one starting in 2010 named Demon, and another with the University of Manchester starting in 2017 named MAGMA. In the United States, the Defense Advanced Research Projects Agency (DARPA) program named Control of Revolutionary Aircraft with Novel Effectors (CRANE) seeks "... to design, build, and flight test a novel X-plane that incorporates active flow control (AFC) as a primary design consideration. ... In 2023, the aircraft received its official designation as X-65", or more fully: Aurora X-65 CRANE. In January 2024, construction began, at Boeing subsidiary Aurora Flight Sciences. According to DARPA, flight tests were to start in summer 2025, but were moved to 2027.

In circulation control, near the trailing edges of wings, aircraft flight control systems are replaced by slots which emit fluid flows.

== List of stealth aircraft ==
- F-117 Nighthawk
- B-2 Spirit
- F-22 Raptor
- F-35 Lightning II
- J-20
- Su-57
- B-21 Raider
- J-35
- Su-75 Checkmate

== List of stealth helicopters ==
- Boeing–Sikorsky RAH-66 Comanche
- Hughes 500P

== List of reduced-signature ships ==
Navy ships worldwide have incorporated signature-reduction features, mostly for the purpose of reducing anti-ship missile detection range and enhancing countermeasure effectiveness rather than actual detection avoidance. Such ships include:

- Bhumibol Adulyadej-class frigate
- Independence-class littoral combat ship
- Kamorta-class corvette
- Klewang-class fast attack craft
- Kolkata-class destroyer
- La Fayette-class frigate
- Nilgiri-class frigate
- Sachsen-class frigate
- Shahid Soleimani-class corvette
- Shivalik-class frigate
- Skjold-class corvette
- Talwar-class frigate
- Tuo Chiang-class corvette
- Type 055 destroyer
- Visakhapatnam-class destroyer
- Visby-class corvette
- Zumwalt-class destroyer

== See also ==
- Active camouflage
- Multi-spectral camouflage
- Cloaking device
- Penetration aid
