= Infrared signature =

Appearance of objects to infrared sensors

Infrared signature, as used by defense scientists and the military, is the appearance of objects to infrared sensors. An infrared signature depends on many factors, including the shape and size of the object, temperature, and emissivity, reflection of external sources (earthshine, sunshine, skyshine) from the object's surface, the background against which it is viewed and the waveband of the detecting sensor. As such there is no all-encompassing definition of infrared signature nor any trivial means of measuring it. For example, the infrared signature of a truck viewed against a field will vary significantly with changing weather, time of day and engine loading.

Two fairly successful examples of defining the infrared signature of an object are the apparent temperature difference at the sensor and the contrast radiant intensity (CRI) definitions.

== Apparent temperature difference ==
The apparent temperature difference method of defining infrared signature gives the physical temperature difference (e.g. in kelvins) between the object of interest and the immediate background if the recorded radiance values had been measured from perfect blackbody sources. Problems with this method include differences in radiance across the object or the immediate background and the finite size of the detector's pixels. The value is a complex function of range, time, aspect, etc.

== Contrast radiant intensity ==
The contrast radiant intensity method of defining infrared signature is to take the difference in average radiance of the object and that of the immediate background and multiply this by the projected area of the object. Again the CRI value will depend on many factors.

== Commercial software ==
In the design phase, it is often desirable to employ a computer to predict what the infrared signature will be before fabricating an actual object. Many iterations of this prediction process can be performed in a short time at low cost, whereas use of a measurement range is often time-consuming, expensive and error-prone.

A number of software houses have built infrared signature prediction software packages. These generally require a CAD model of interest plus a large set of parameters to describe a specific thermal environment and the internal temperatures of the platform and thermal properties of the construction materials. The software then solves a set of thermal equations across the boundaries and for electromagnetic propagation in a specified infrared waveband. The primary output is a measure of infrared signature, though usually surface temperatures can be given (since this usually has to be calculated to obtain the infrared signature prediction) and also visual representations of how the scene may appear to various imaging infrared detectors.

Infrared signature prediction models are very difficult to validate except for simple cases because of the difficulty in modelling a complex environment. Both sensitivity analysis of this type of software and experimental measurements has shown that small variations in weather can have a significant impact on the results. As such, there are limitations on what can be achieved from modelling the infrared problem, and sometimes experimentation is necessary to achieve accurate knowledge of the nature of an object's physical existence in the infrared wavebands.

== Infrared stealth ==
Infrared stealth is an area of stealth technology aimed at reducing infrared signatures. This reduces a platform's susceptibility to infrared guided weapons and infrared surveillance sensors, and thus increases the platform's overall survivability. Infrared stealth is particularly applicable to military jets because of the detectable engines and plumes from non-stealth aircraft, but it also applies to military helicopters, warships, land vehicles and dismounted soldiers.

A military aim in studying infrared signatures is to understand the likely infrared signature of threats (and develop the equipment required to detect them) and to reduce the infrared signature of their own assets to threat sensors. In practice this might mean equipping a warship with sensors to detect the exhaust plumes of incoming anti-ship missiles while also having an infrared signature below the detection threshold of the infrared sensor guiding the missile.

An exhaust plume contributes a significant infrared signature. One means to reduce IR signature is to have a non-circular tail pipe (a slit shape) to minimize the exhaust cross-sectional volume and maximize the mixing of hot exhaust with cool ambient air (see Lockheed F-117 Nighthawk). Often, cool air is deliberately injected into the exhaust flow to boost this process (see Ryan AQM-91 Firefly and Northrop B-2 Spirit). The nozzle shape could be designed to facilitate mixing of the exhaust with ambient air as with the rectangular nozzles on the Lockheed Martin F-22 Raptor. Sometimes, the jet exhaust is vented above the wing surface to shield it from observers below, as in the Lockheed F-117 Nighthawk, and the unstealthy Fairchild Republic A-10 Thunderbolt II. To achieve infrared stealth, the exhaust gas is cooled to the temperatures where the brightest wavelengths it radiates are absorbed by atmospheric carbon dioxide and water vapor, dramatically reducing the infrared visibility of the exhaust plume. Another way to reduce the exhaust temperature is to circulate coolant fluids such as fuel inside the exhaust pipe, where the fuel tanks serve as heat sinks cooled by the flow of air along the wings.

Ground combat includes the use of both active and passive infrared sensors and so the USMC ground combat uniform requirements document specifies infrared reflective quality standards.

== See also ==
- Infrared
- Electromagnetic modeling
- Radar cross section
- Infrared detector
- Infrared countermeasures
- Survivability
