= Stealth ground vehicle =

Vehicles which use stealth technology

Stealth vehicles

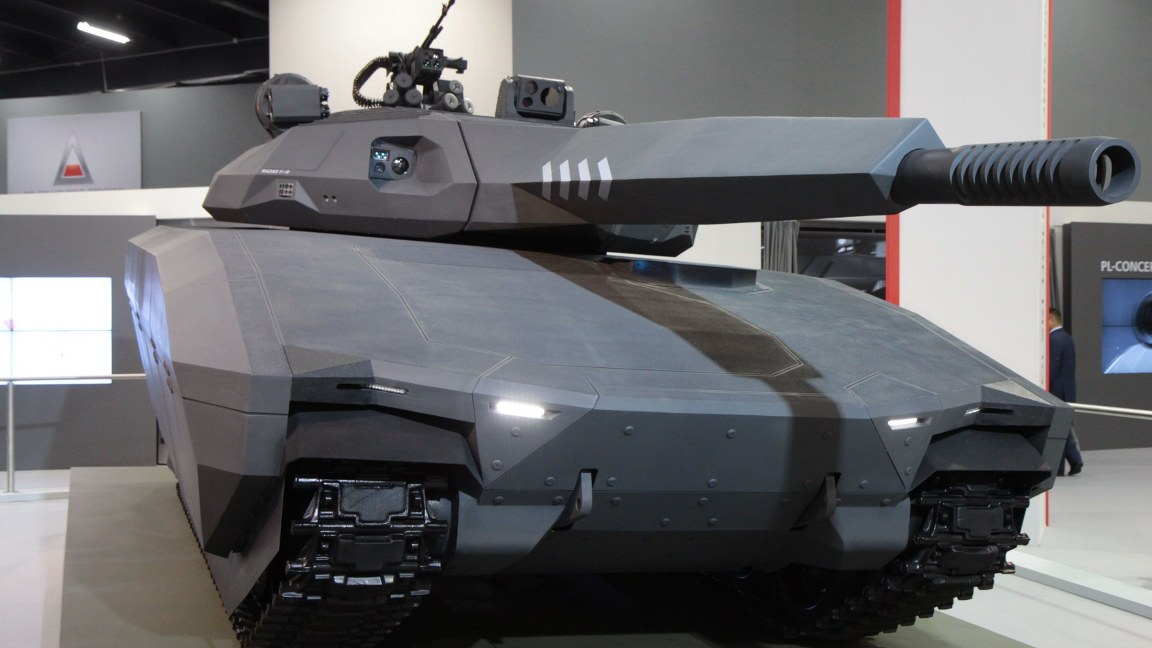
PL-01, Poland, stealth tank

Challenger 2, British Army, incorporates stealth technology

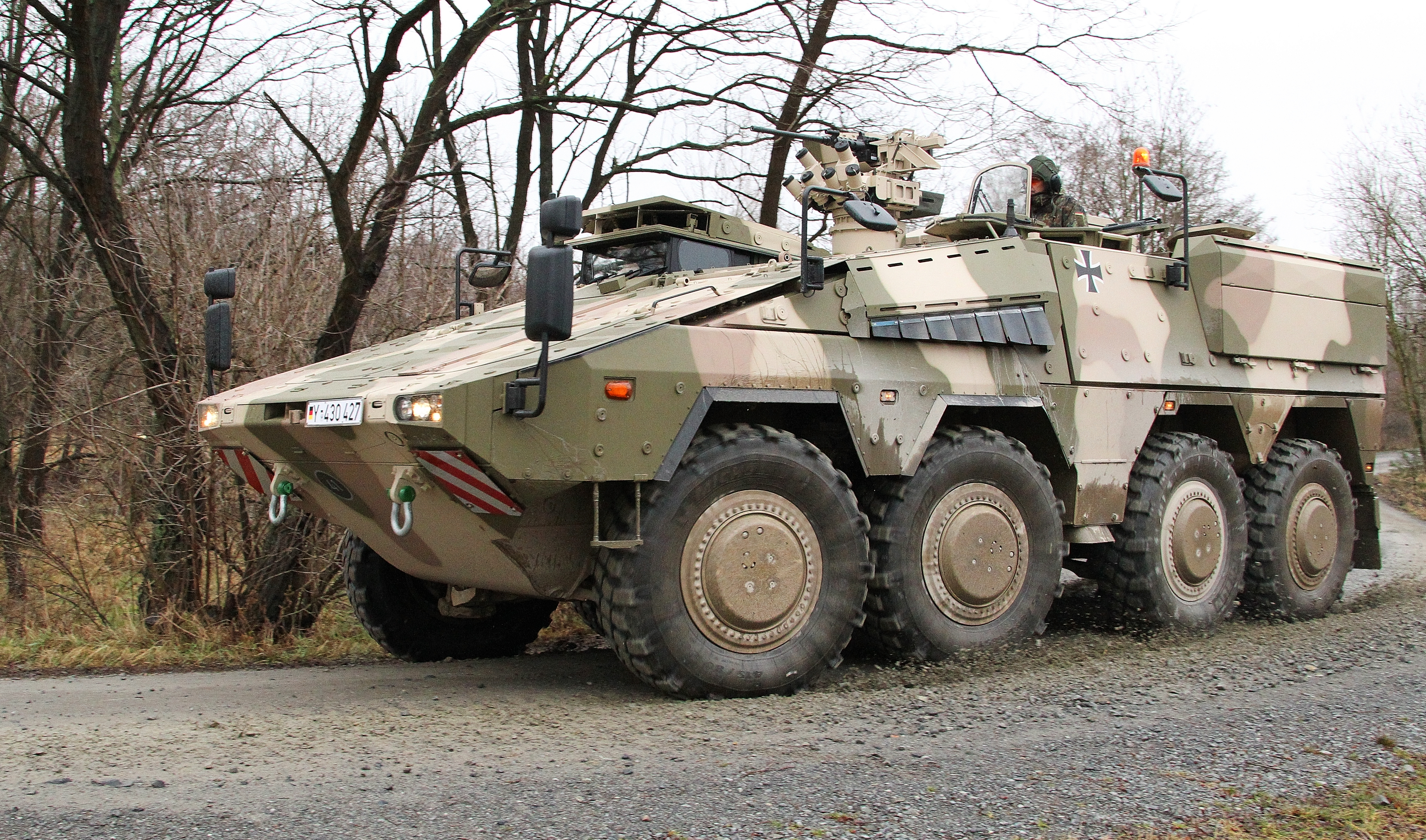
GTK Boxer MRAV, German Army, incorporates visual, thermal, and acoustic stealth technology

Ground vehicles using stealth technology have come to fruition at various times in history.

The Swedish Stridsvagn 103 was designed with a low profile to decrease chances of being detected.

The Chieftain Signature Integration Demonstrator (SID) was a first British effort in stealth tank technology.

The Challenger 2 features a redesigned hull and turret with lower radar cross section than its predecessor. More recently, the joint U.S./British Future Scout Cavalry System concept was experimented with and appeared in prototype form before being canceled. Other vehicles, particularly unmanned ground vehicles, may unintentionally have an undetectably low radar signature due to their small size. Various coatings and radar absorbing layers of material are available for combat vehicles.

The Armored Gun System program of the 1980s attempted to create a stealth vehicle. One of the competitors, the Stingray light tank later became Thailand's light tank. The M1A2 Abrams was also originally supposed to incorporate stealth. The U.S. Future Combat Systems manned ground vehicles family also incorporated a reduced cross section but was canceled in 2009.

GIAT used an AMX-30 to create a prototype called the Démonstrateur Furtif Chenillé (Tracked Stealthy Demonstrator). Cold air is constantly pumped between the armor and the outer non-metallic skin layer to reduce infrared signature.

Active camouflage (see Adaptiv) is a method of concealing ground vehicles from enemy infrared sensors. This system has been used on the Swedish CV90120-T Ghost prototype, and the Polish PL-01 derived from it.

Another way of reducing heat signature is replacing combustion engines with electric propulsion. SAIC and Lockheed Martin are developing the first U.S. electric tank prototype.

The GTK Boxer MRAV features a gap between primary and adaptive armor that reduces infrared signature.
