= Low-frequency radar =

Rada type by frequency

Low-frequency radar is radar which uses frequencies lower than 1 GHz such as L-band, UHF, VHF, and HF, as opposed to the usual radar bands, which range from 2 GHz to 40 GHz.The radar cross section of any target depends on the frequency transmitted by the radar. Below 900 MHz the target radar cross section increases exponentially, however the increased radar cross section means that there is also much more radar return from undesirable sources, such as cloud cover and rain (cf. weather radar). It is because of this that radars traditionally use much higher frequencies, with an exception being the radars operated in the 3-30 MHz band which are used as over-the-horizon radar stations because signals in that range are able to reflect off the ionosphere.

Recent interest has accumulated in developing radars which operate in these low frequencies to help counter the advancement in stealth technology by applying advanced digital signal processing to these bands in order to reduce radar clutter. If the radar wavelength is roughly twice the size of the target, a half-wave resonance effect can still generate a significant return. However, low-frequency radar is limited by shortage of unused frequencies, lack of accuracy given the long wavelength, and by the radar's size, making it difficult to transport and making for an easy target. A long-wave radar may detect a target and roughly locate it, but not identify it, and the location information lacks sufficient accuracy for weapon targeting.
