= BAE Systems AB =

Swedish arms manufacturer

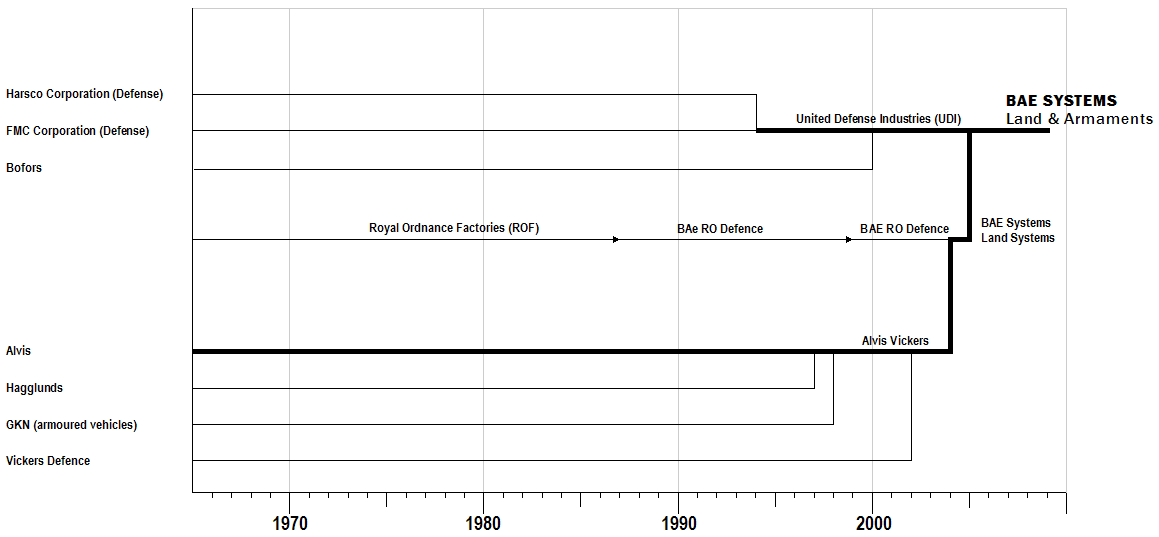
Evolution of the land systems division of BAE Systems, 1970s to Land & Armaments formation

BAE Systems AB is a subsidiary holding company for the Swedish assets of BAE Systems Land & Armaments, whose ultimate parent is the British defence contractor BAE Systems.

The portfolio in 2020 contained the companies Systems C-ITS, involved in simulators and training; Bofors, that produces tube gun systems and related munitions; Hägglunds, the manufacturer of tracked military and civilian vehicles.

== Subsidiaries ==
=== BAE Systems Hägglunds ===
AB Hägglund & Söner was founded in 1899 by Johan Hägglund in Gullänget, Örnsköldsvik, Sweden. The company was divided in 1988, one part being Hägglunds Vehicle AB, the military vehicles business. In October 1997 the British company Alvis plc acquired Hägglunds Vehicle AB to form Alvis Hägglunds AB. Alvis expanded its military vehicle business in 1998 with the purchase of GKN's armoured vehicle division in 1998 and Vickers Defence in 2002 to form Alvis Vickers. In September 2004 BAE Systems acquired Alvis Vickers and merged it with its RO Defence ordnance division to form BAE Systems Land Systems. Hägglunds was renamed Land Systems Hägglunds.

In June 2005 BAE Systems acquired United Defense and reorganised its land systems businesses into BAE Systems Land and Armaments, with Land Systems and Land Systems Hägglunds as subsidiaries of this U.S. based operating group.

=== BAE Systems Bofors ===
BAE Systems Bofors AB, located in Karlskoga, Sweden, is a Swedish subsidiary of BAE Systems Platforms & Services.

Its corporate heritage goes back to Bofors, which was founded in 1646 and entered the Defence business in 1883. In 1999 Saab purchased the Celsius Group, the parent group of Bofors. In September 2000 United Defense Industries (UDI) purchased Bofors Weapon Systems from Saab (the tube artillery interests), while Saab retained the missile interests. In 2005 BAE Systems purchased UDI and re-organised all its land systems businesses into BAE Systems Land and Armaments. As part of acquisition Bofors Defence was renamed BAE Systems Bofors.

=== BAE Systems C-ITS ===
The company "construct, develop and maintain computer based education-, training-, management- and command systems in Europe". It originated from the former United Defense company. On 28 November 2007, BAE Systems acquired the Swedish high-tech company Pitch Technologies AB founded in 1991, an innovator of computer-based research simulation and training technologies. C-ITS is registered as inactive since 2018.

== Products ==
=== All-terrain vehicles ===
- Bandvagn 202 tracked articulated all-terrain vehicle
- Bandvagn 206 tracked articulated all-terrain vehicle
- BvS 10 tracked articulated all-terrain vehicle

=== Combat vehicles ===
- Pansarbandvagn 302
- Combat Vehicle 90
- SEP
- Stridsvagn 122

=== Weapon systems ===
- 40 mm Tridon
- 40 mm TriAD
- Archer SP Artillery
- FH 77 Howitzer
- Bofors 57 mm & Bofors 40 mm Naval guns

=== Ammunitions ===
- Bofors Bonus Anti-armour artillery shell.
- XM982 Excalibur Ammunition
- 3P Ammunition

=== Camouflage ===
- Adaptiv
