= Combat Vehicle 90 =

Swedish Infantry fighting vehicle

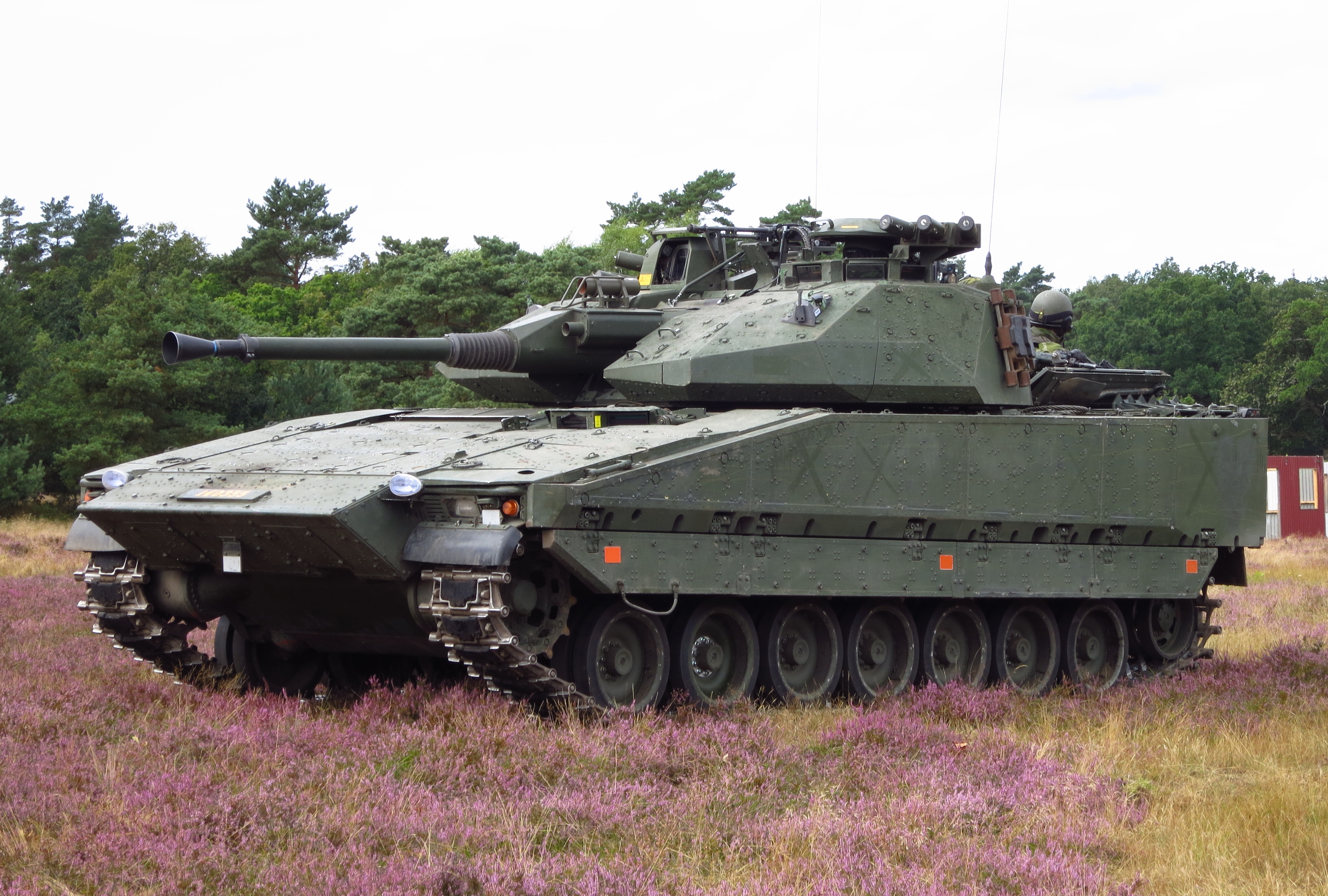
- A strf 9040C in Swedish service
- Type: Infantry fighting vehicle
- Place of origin: Sweden

Service history
- In service: 1994–present
- Used by: See Operators
- Wars: War in Afghanistan; United Nations Mission in Liberia; Russo-Ukrainian war

Production history
- Designer: Hägglunds/Bofors
- Designed: late 1980s
- Manufacturer: BAE Systems AB
- Produced: 1993–present
- No. built: 1,400

Specifications
- Mass: 23–38 tonnes (Mk 0 to Mk IV)
- Length: 6.8 m (22 ft)
- Width: 3.2 m (10 ft)
- Height: 2.8 m (9 ft 2 in)
- Crew: 3 (commander, gunner, driver); 7–8 troopers
- Armor: front against 30 mm APFSDS, all-round protection against 14.5 mm AP rounds, integration of Iron Fist APS
- Main armament: 40 mm Bofors L/70 autocannon; or; 35 mm/50 Bushmaster autocannon (export models Mk III and Mk IV); or; 30 mm/40 Bushmaster autocannon (export model Mk I & Mk II); or; Cockerill XC-8 turret with 105 mm/120 mm cannon; or; 120 mm mortar
- Secondary armament: 7.62 mm Ksp m/39 machine gun; or; 7.62 FN MAG machine gun; and; 6 × 76 mm grenade launchers; Spike LR anti-tank guided missile
- Transmission: CV90 MkI - MkIII: Automatic Perkins X300 (4 forward, 2 reverse); CV90 MkIV: Allison 4040 MX
- Suspension: torsion bar or active suspension
- Operational range: offroad 320 km (200 mi), onroad 900 km (560 mi)
- Maximum speed: 70 km/h (43 mph)

The Combat Vehicle 90 (CV90) (Swedish: stridsfordon 90, strf 90 or Stridsfordon 90) is a family of Swedish tracked armoured combat vehicles designed by the Swedish Defence Materiel Administration (FMV), Hägglund & Söner and Bofors during the mid-1980s to early 1990s, before entering service in Sweden in the mid-1990s. The CV90 platform design has continuously evolved from the Mk 0 to the current Mk IV with technological advances and changing battlefield requirements.

The Swedish version of the main infantry fighting vehicle (IFV) is fitted with a turret from Bofors equipped with a 40 mm Bofors autocannon. Export versions are fitted with Hägglunds E-series turrets, armed with either a 30 mm Mk44 or a 35 mm Bushmaster autocannon. Over time, the involvement of Hägglund & Söner has been superseded by Alvis Hägglunds (from 1997) and BAE Systems Hägglunds (from 2004).

Developed specifically for the Nordic subarctic climate, the vehicle has very good mobility in snow and wetlands while carrying and supporting eight, and in later versions six, fully equipped soldiers. Other variants include forward artillery observation, command and control, anti-aircraft, armoured recovery vehicle, electronic warfare versions and so forth. Currently, 1,400 vehicles in 17 variants are (or will be) in service with ten user states, seven of which are part of the NATO alliance.

== History ==
During the Cold War, in 1983, the Swedish Army required vehicles with high mobility, air defence and anti-tank capability, high survivability and protection. In 1985, the "stridsfordon 90" project group, made up of representatives from the Swedish Armed Forces (Försvarsmakten), the FMV and Swedish industry (including Hägglunds and Bofors), finalized the design for a "unity vehicle" that originated from an air force concept. In 1986, the prototypes for strf 9040 and strf 9025 were ordered. Five prototypes were constructed but, before delivery in 1988, the 9025 version was discontinued. The prototypes were tested during extensive trials between 1988 and 1991, during which prototypes for specialized variants (forward observation, command and control, and armoured recovery vehicles) were ordered. The first deliveries started in 1994.

The CV90 has undergone four mark shifts to meet different customer requirements, focusing on capability enhancements.

=== CV90 Mk 0 ===
The first CV90 delivered (retroactively named mark 0) was for Sweden, and was armed with a Bofors 40/70B cannon (a dedicated armored fighting vehicle variant of the Bofors 40 mm Automatic Gun L/70) in a two-man turret, which had beaten out the 25 mm M242 Bushmaster chain gun during initial prototype trials. The Mk 0 has a conventional electrical system and was fitted for but not with appliqué armour systems. The Swedish Army ordered five variants of the CV90. The requirements expressed by the Swedish FMV on signature management were extremely challenging and led to a lot of new design features inherited by all subsequent generations (Mks 0 to III). FMV also prioritized the requirements to provide the best possible design to fulfil user needs. Furthermore, the CV90 was also built for high reliability and ease of maintenance using only standard onboard tools and for conscripts to maintain and operate.

=== CV90 Mk I ===
The next variant of CV90, known as the Mk I, was delivered to Norway after winning the country's competition for a new IFV against contemporaries such as the American M2 Bradley, British FV510 Warrior, and Austro-Spanish ASCOD (Pizarro/ULAN). The Mk I variant of the CV90 had a newly designed two-man 30 mm turret, evolved from the 25 mm turret. CV90 Mk I was the first IFV with high-hit probability performance during suppression fire modes, both while the vehicle is on the move and against air targets. The CV90 Mk I incorporated several improvements over the original Swedish CV90. Evaluations of mobility, reliability, lethality, fightability, ergonomics, durability and survivability were performed during the CV90 Mk I trial phase for these vehicles, with good results.

=== CV90 Mk II ===
The CV90 Mk I was the base for the next development, the CV90 Mk II. The Mk II was produced in three variants: the CV9030 CH (Switzerland) IFV and COM, and the CV9030 FIN (Finland) IFV. Both contracts were won in competition against other IFVs. One significant difference between the two variants was hull size: the Swiss variant is 100 mm higher over the front, with an additional 70 mm over the combat compartment at the rear. Another difference is the Mk II's partial digitization and built-in Health & Unit Monitoring System (HUMS), along with interactive manuals and instructions. The CV90 Mk II's standard armament is the Mk44 Bushmaster II autocannon.

=== CV90 Mk III ===
The Mk III variant of the CV90 is a further development of the CV90 Mk II. The areas that underwent the most development were lethality, fightability, electronic architecture, survivability and mobility. The weapon system was upgraded to a 35/50 mm Bushmaster III cannon with an integrated muzzle ammunition programmer and a number of different firing scenarios depending on target setup. The crew station design provides the gunner and commander with a continuous eye-on-target engagement feature (crew members do not need to remove their head from the eyepiece to see and operate equipment).

Further electronic architecture upgrades made the Mk III completely digitized. Mobility improvements consisted of upgraded suspension and enhanced power-to-weight ratio to handle the increased gross vehicle weight. Improved survivability mainly came in the areas of mine protection and top attack. Horizontal protection was designed in similar ways to other CV90 variants, i.e. appliqué systems. The first variant of the Mk III, the Mk IIIa, was delivered to the Netherlands and Denmark, and the second, more modern Mk IIIb variant was delivered to Norway.

=== CV90 Mk IV ===
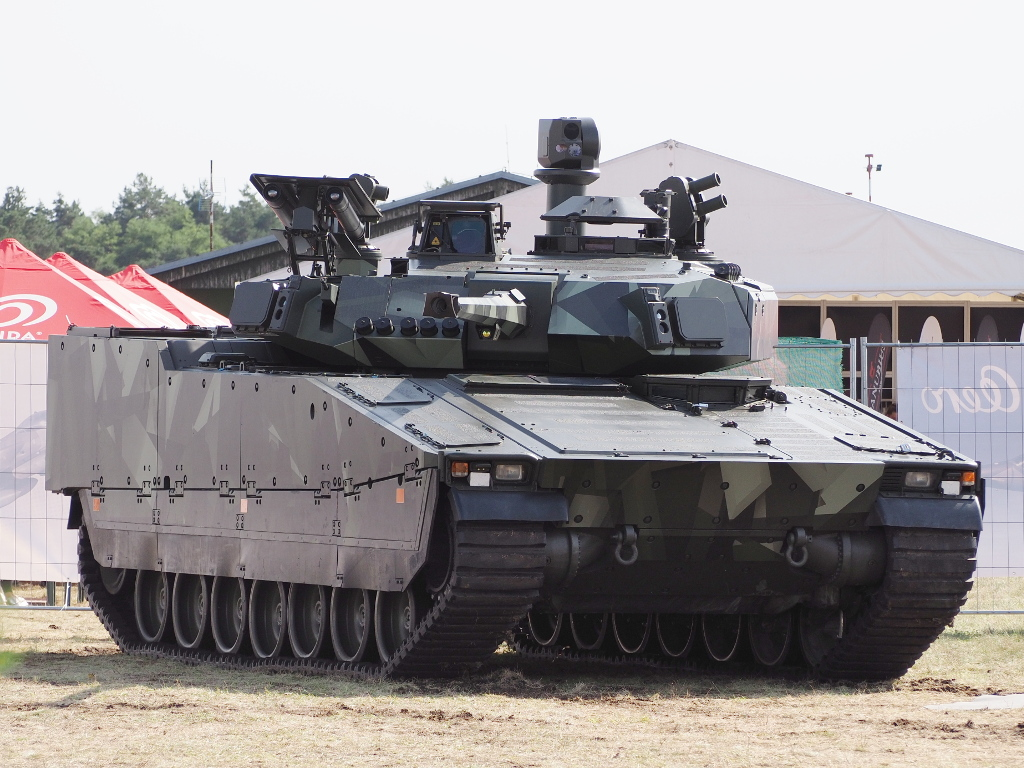
CV90 Mk IV variant

The CV90 Mk IV is equipped with a new Scania engine, which develops up to 1,000 horsepower (750 kW), and the latest upgraded X300 heavy-duty transmission. Its maximum weight was increased from 35 to 37 tonnes, with space for two tonnes of additional payload, without a decrease in vehicle agility. It features a new augmented reality system named iFighting. The iFighting concept fuses data from different systems within the vehicle to filter and prioritize the most critical information, allowing quicker crew decision-making and improved battlefield performance. The Mk IV generation is also the first Western IFV with a qualified Active Protection System. It is equipped with fourth generation electronic architecture supporting future technology adoption and growth.

=== CV90 Mk V ===
The Swedish army is supporting the development of an improved variant from between 2023 and 2027. No agreement has yet been concluded between the FMV and the industry on that development. The development goals focus on:

- A hybrid electric propulsion system will be proposed and potentially integrated to this version
- The C4ISR system is to be fully digitalized
- Improvement of the heat, radar and visual signature management of the vehicle
- Integrate Beyond Line Of Sight (BLOS) anti-tank guided missiles. Akeron MP is a next generation medium-range, man-portable, anti-tank missile, which has a BLOS capability.
- Integration of UAV.

Initial tests involving the use of the Akeron MP and of a UAV were performed in January 2023.

This variant might be ordered, and it would extend the lifetime of the CV90 in the Swedish Army beyond 2034. An upgrade of the IFV variant (strf 90) including some of these elements is very likely.

== Design ==
Varying customer requirements have led to multiple CV90 variants with major differences in survivability and electronic architecture. Increased protection has led to higher curb weight; the vehicle's combat weight has risen from 23 to 35 tonnes. With increasingly powerful diesel engines, the power-to-weight ratio has remained approximately the same. The track suspension system has seen several successive upgrades.

The Mk III version has a digital electronic architecture with several different CAN-buses and digital networks, and is the first IFV incorporating an automatic defensive aide suite which classifies threats and, in automatic mode, can fire smoke and/or the main gun to eliminate or evade targets, as well as instruct the driver on potential threats. At the Eurosatory 2010 exhibition, a version called Armadillo was presented. The Armadillo shown was an armoured personnel carrier (APC) version. The basic chassis can be readily converted to ambulance, control vehicle or other turreted versions.

=== Protection ===
The CV9040's basic armour provides all-round protection against 14.5 mm armour-piercing rounds. Armour protection over the frontal arc is classified, but all models from CV9040B onwards are said to be protected against 30 mm APFSDS rounds. Some variants, including the CV9030N, can be fitted with MEXAS, a ceramic appliqué armor that provides protection against 30 mm APFSDS. This armour kit is intended to provide increased protection against improvised explosive devices, explosively formed penetrators, and 30 mm caliber armour-piercing rounds. All CV90s are fitted with a spall liner, which covers the interior spaces and provides protection for the troops inside against shrapnel and anti-personnel artillery munitions.

The CV90 can also be fitted with cage armour, which provides protection against tandem-charge and shaped charge warheads. The CV90 is fitted with a nuclear, biological, and chemical (NBC) filtration system accompanied by a chemical detector and radiation detector systems. The CV90 also uses heat-absorbing filters to provide temporary protection against thermal imaging, image intensifiers and infrared cameras. The CV90 was designed with a very low and compact structure to minimize radar and IR signatures.

With every generation of CV90 there has been an increase in payload and corresponding protection levels. The inherent mine protection levels have risen substantially to presently defeat the heaviest (10 kg TNT) anti-tank mines.

In December 2016, BAE Systems received a contract from the Netherlands to test the Israel Military Industries Iron Fist active protection system on their CV9035 vehicles. Iron Fist employs a multi-sensor early warning system using both infrared and radar sensors to deploy soft- and hard-kill countermeasures against anti-tank rockets and missiles. A decision for integration was to be made by early 2018.

In 2011, Hägglunds (now BAE Systems AB) demonstrated a version with an infrared camouflage called Adaptiv, consisting of thermoelectric plates capable of posing as many different objects, such as ordinary cars, stones, trees etc. to an enemy IR-viewfinder. It takes 1,500 plates to cover a CV90, at a cost of $100 per plate.

=== Mobility ===
The CV90 Mk 0 is powered by a DSI14 engine developed by Scania, which provides 550 horsepower and can reach speeds of 70 kilometres (43 mi) per hour. The basic CV90 has a maximum road range of 320 kilometres (200 mi), but the latest generation can reach up to 600 kilometres (370 mi). The CV90 offers quiet movement for improved stealth, high speed over good terrain, and high ground clearance for protection against mines and improvised explosive devices.

BAE Systems is considering upgrading the CV90 with a hybrid-electric propulsion system as armies look to cut fuel expenses to respond to environmental issues and fuel economy. A hybrid-electric drive could cut fuel consumption by 10 to 30 percent. The new system would also provide a power boost to move the vehicle. The hybrid-electric combines a standard diesel engine with a battery pack to provide extra power to propel the vehicle or provide additional electricity. BAE Systems Hägglunds uses the knowledge acquired through many years of hybrid-electric drive development for the military SEP vehicles and the ongoing civilian hybrid-electric projects for forest machines, airplane howlers and loaders.

In April 2015, BAE Systems fitted a CV90 with an active damping suspension system derived from Formula One racing cars. This technology calculates the vehicle's speed and anticipates the terrain ahead, then pressurizes the suspension at independent points to lift the chassis and keep the vehicle level. The suspension, which had been modified to suit a 38-ton armored vehicle rather than a 700 kg (1,500 lb) racing car, reportedly increases speed by 30-40 percent on rough terrain, outrunning main battle tanks, decreases vehicle pitch acceleration by 40 percent, gives greater maneuverability and stability for on-the-move gunnery, and reduces crew fatigue and life-cycle costs.

=== Armament ===
The basic Swedish CV90 (strf 9040) is fitted with a two-man turret armed with a Bofors 40/70B autocannon and a coaxial 7.62 mm machine gun. The CV90 also carries six 76 mm grenade launchers, which are arranged in two clusters of three launchers; the clusters are positioned on each side of the turret. The grenade launchers are intended for smoke grenades, but can also be loaded with a variety of combat grenades.

The CV90 export variants are fitted with a Hägglunds E-series turret, with more than 600 E30 (30 mm Bushmaster II) and E35 (35 mm Bushmaster III) turrets delivered. BAE Systems Australia presented an offer for LAND 400 Phase 3 is the CV9035 with an E35 turret. It provides high commonality with BAE Systems’ LAND 400 Phase 2 CRV offer – the AMV35 – through its use of the same E35 turret system.

=== Sight ===
The CV90 is equipped with the Universal Tank and Anti-Aircraft Sight from Saab which has daytime optical, thermal imaging system and Generation III image intensification. The Norwegian IFV, C2, Recce, Mortar and Combat Engineer variants are delivered with the Kongsberg Protector remote weapon station with 360 degrees day and night sights as well as hunter-killer capability.

== Production ==
Production of the CV90 began in 1993, and as of 2014 over 1,200 vehicles had been ordered. In November 2000, Finland ordered 57 CV9030 vehicles. Total cost was €250 million (2008 value), or €4.42 million per vehicle. In June 2004, Finland made another purchase, bringing the overall quantity ordered to 102. This time, the cost was €2.92 million (2008 value) per vehicle. In December 2005, Denmark ordered 45 CV9035 vehicles for a cost of €188 million or €4.18 million per vehicle.

The Netherlands ordered 184 combat plus 8 instruction CV9035 vehicles for a cost of €749 million, or €3.9 million per vehicle. Norway initially bought 104 CV90s in the 1990s, buying new vehicles and upgrading the old ones in the 2010s. The Norwegian Army fields 164 CV90s, of which 74 are combat vehicles, 28 combat-engineering vehicles, 24 multi-purpose vehicles, 21 reconnaissance vehicles, 15 command vehicles, and two instruction vehicles. The upgrade of the Norwegian CV90s was estimated to cost around 10 billion kr.

In August 2023, following a visit by Ukrainian president Volodymyr Zelenskyy to Stockholm, he announced an agreement with Sweden to start production of the CV90 in Ukraine.

In June 2024, it was reported that the Netherlands will manufacture 180 CV90s.

== Domestic variants of the CV90 ==
=== Domestic variants in service ===
The following versions were developed by Hägglund/Bofors in cooperation with FOA and FMV for Försvarsmakten as part of the stridsfordon 90 (strf 90)-family.

==== Stridsfordon 9040 (Strf 9040) ====
The original model carries eight soldiers and is equipped with a 40 mm Bofors autocannon. Versions are referred to by the letters A, B or C depending on upgrades. They all are based on the CV90 Mk I. All from A onwards remain in service.
- Strf 9040: Original production version with no gun stabilization and Lyran mortar. Incremental improvements were made during production; all have been upgraded to strf 9040A standard.
- Strf 9040A: Strf 9040 upgraded with extensive chassis modifications and external gun stabilisation on turret front. It has more storage and better emergency exits, and the seats in the troop compartment were reduced to seven. From November 1997, the gun was gyro-stabilized.
- Strf 9040B: Strf 9040A updated with improvements to armament (new fire control software, electric firing pin, fully stabilised gun with internal stabilisation and reserve sight with video camera for the gunner), improved suspension for better accuracy and crew comfort while moving, new instrumentation and new seat belts.
- Strf 9040B1: Strf 9040B modified for international peacekeeping missions. It has a 3P ammunition programmer, climate control and anti-spall liner.
- Strf 9040C: Upgraded version for crew training and international operations. As per 9040B1 with additional all-round armour, laser filtering in all periscopes and tropical grade air conditioning. Due to the bulk and weight of the modifications, only six soldiers can be carried.

==== Stridsledningspansarbandvagn 90 (Stripbv 90) ====
Forward command vehicle variant, used by battalion and brigade commanders. Equipped with communication systems and command and control systems. This variant is only armed with a machine gun and 6 smoke grenade launchers.
- Stripbv 90A: Base variant of the Stripbv 90 series.
- Stripbv 90C: Two were upgraded to C-standard, but have been decommissioned as of 2011.

==== Eldledningspansarbandvagn 90 (Epbv 90) ====
Forward artillery observation variant, used to direct artillery and mortar fire.
- Epbv 90A: 34 initially ordered.
- Epbv 90C: 8 upgraded for international service, includes air conditioning, additional protection, and more advanced IR sensor.

==== Luftvärnskanonvagn 9040 (Lvkv 9040) ====
Self-propelled anti-aircraft gun vehicle:
- Lvkv 90A: fitted with PS-95 radar from Thomson CSF Harfang (now Thales Group) and a high elevation 40 mm autocannon capable of using programmable ammunition. It is connected to the national air defence net LuLIS.
- Lvkv 90C: Three have been upgraded to C-standard.
- Lvkv 90 TD: There is also a demonstrator, designated Lvkv 90-TD, fitted with infrared video targeting and a fully stabilised gun for firing on the move.

==== Granatkastarpansarbandvagn 90 (Grkpbv 90) ====
Tracked mortar carrier, known as "Mjölner", a CV90 fitted with two 120 mm mortars. The mortar tubes are supplied by the Slovak defence manufacturer Konstrukta.
- First order: The 40 CV90 hulls for this project had already been purchased by 2003 and were originally intended to be equipped with the Patria Advanced Mortar System. For economic reasons, Genomförandegruppen recommended against it and the AMOS order was cancelled with the vehicles put in storage until BAE Systems AB received a contract in December 2016 to install Mjölner 120 mm mortars on the 40 CV90s to increase the indirect fire capability of mechanized battalions. The first units were delivered in January 2019 and all 40 vehicles had been delivered by 2020. The first 40 CV90 Mjölner will later be upgraded to this standard with the C4I LSS Mark artillery command and control system.
- Second order: In 2022 an additional 20 vehicles were ordered with deliveries scheduled for between 2023 and 2025.
- Third order: In January 2023, a new order of 20 systems was concluded, and the deliveries will be completed by 2025. These systems will get the new C4I LSS Mark artillery command and control system.

==== Bärgningsbandvagn 90 (Bgbv 90) ====
Armoured recovery vehicle, equipped with two 9-tonnes winches, and provide a total of 72 tonnes pulling capacity through 4-way pulleys.
- Bgbv 90A: The chassis is based on the Epbv 90A.
- Bgbv 90C: Three have been upgraded to C-standard for foreign operations with A/C and more protection. At least one has been used in Afghanistan.

=== Domestic variants in development ===
==== Stridsfordon 9035 MkIIIC (Strf 9035 MkIIIC) ====
Infantry fighting vehicle ordered in December 2024 by the Swedish Army, in collaboration with Denmark, and additional ordered for Ukraine.
This variant is to be equipped with the D-Series turret of BAE Systems AB, to be manufactured by Van Halteren Defence:
- Bushmaster III (35 × 228 mm)
- MAG 58C (7.62×51mm NATO) in a pod
- 2 × RBS 58 (Akeron MP)
- 1 × 5 smoke grenade dispensers

==== Driftstödspansarbandvagn 90 (DSpbv 90D) ====
Armoured repair vehicle. This vehicle is designed to carry out repairs at a battalion level.
Its development was ordered in November 2022 to BAE Systems and to the Norwegian Rytek A/S, who already developed engineering variants for the Norwegian Army.

==== Pionjärpansarbandvagn 90 (Pipbv 90D) ====
Pioneer armoured vehicle designed to carry pioneer works on the front line. The variant is based on the Combat Vehicle 9040A where the turret has been removed and replaced with a fixed superstructure, new interior and a larger cargo space. The vehicle has been equipped with a weapons station, dozer blade, surface mine plow and mine drill. The door at the rear has been replaced with a hydraulic ramp for easier entry and exit. Its development was ordered in November 2022 to BAE Systems and to the Norwegian Rytek A/S, who already developed engineering variants for the Norwegian Army. 30 vehicles have been ordered.

=== Prototypes ===
These prototypes were planned for the Swedish Army.

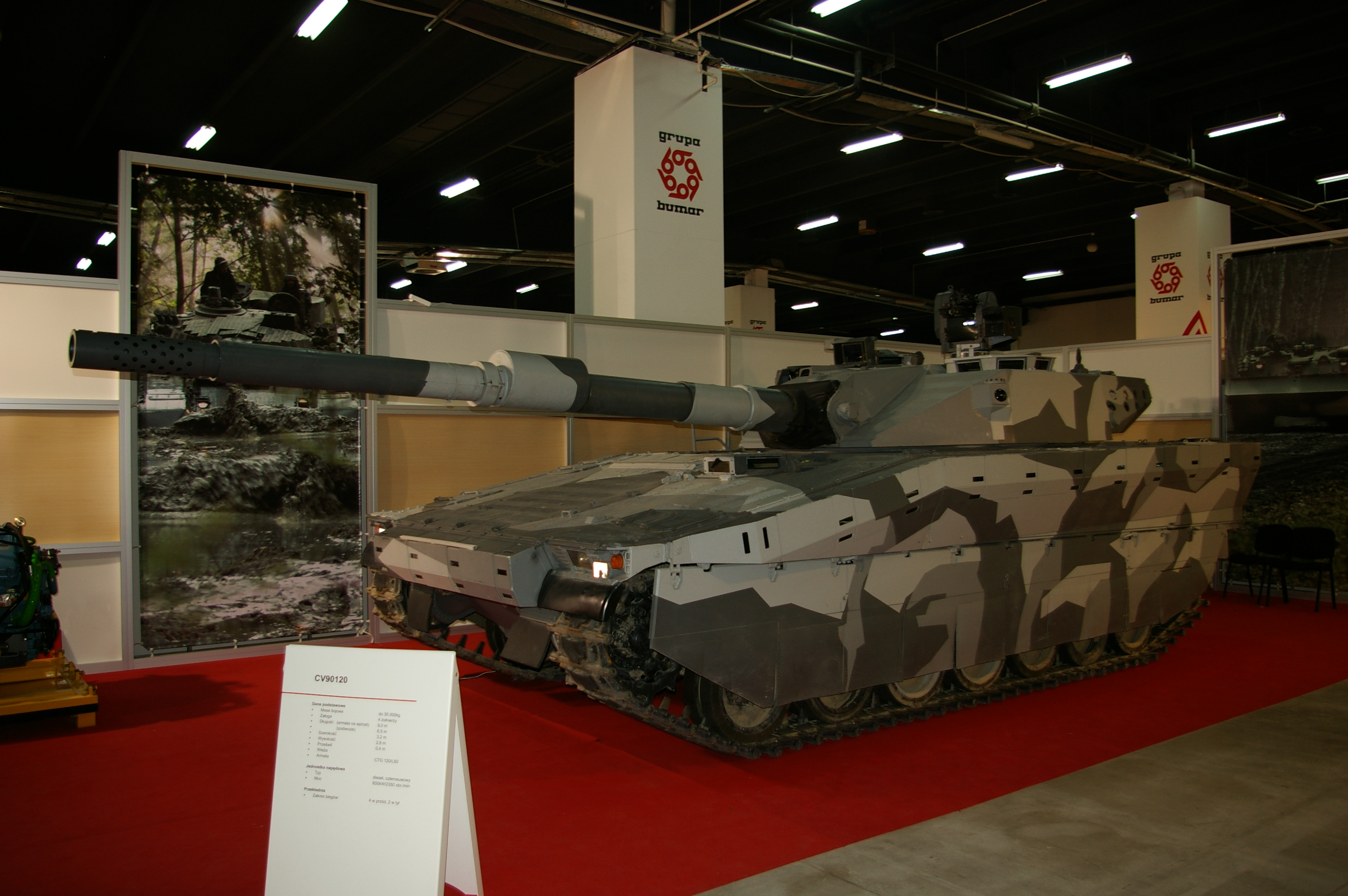
CV90120-T prototype, from which PL-01 mockup was developed

Störpansarbandvagn 90 (störpbv 90):
An electronic warfare vehicle based on a CV9040A that had its turret replaced with a fixed housing containing a retractable mast and a LEMUR weapons station. Planned in 2002, a single unit was produced before serial production was cancelled for economic reasons and as of 2013 the project is still on hold.
Stridsfordon 9040BILL (strf 9040BILL):
Prototype version of the CV9040 equipped with the Bofors RB56 anti-tank missile. Issues with the sight alignment were unsolved and no units were ordered.
Stridsfordon 90120 (strf 90120 / CV90120-T):
A Light tank demonstrator armed with CTG 120/L50 (Compact Tank Gun) developed by RUAG. The gun is a 120 mm smoothbore, calibre length 50, with a rate of fire of 12–14 rounds per minute. Twelve rounds are kept ready in the turret bustle, with a further 33 stowed in the hull rear.

== Export variants of the CV90 ==
The export versions of CV90 is delivered with the BAE Systems Hägglunds E-series turrets with armament ranging from 30 to 120 mm. The vast majority of the 600 turrets delivered are fitted with 30 mm or 35 mm guns.

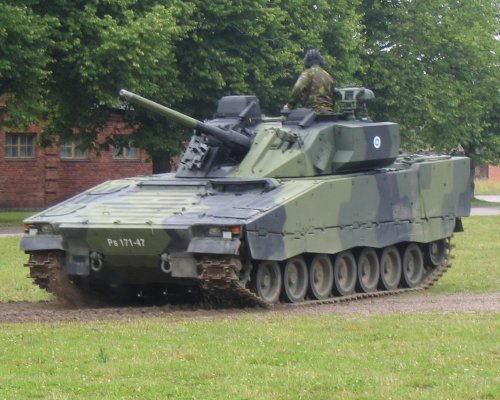
Finnish CV9030FIN

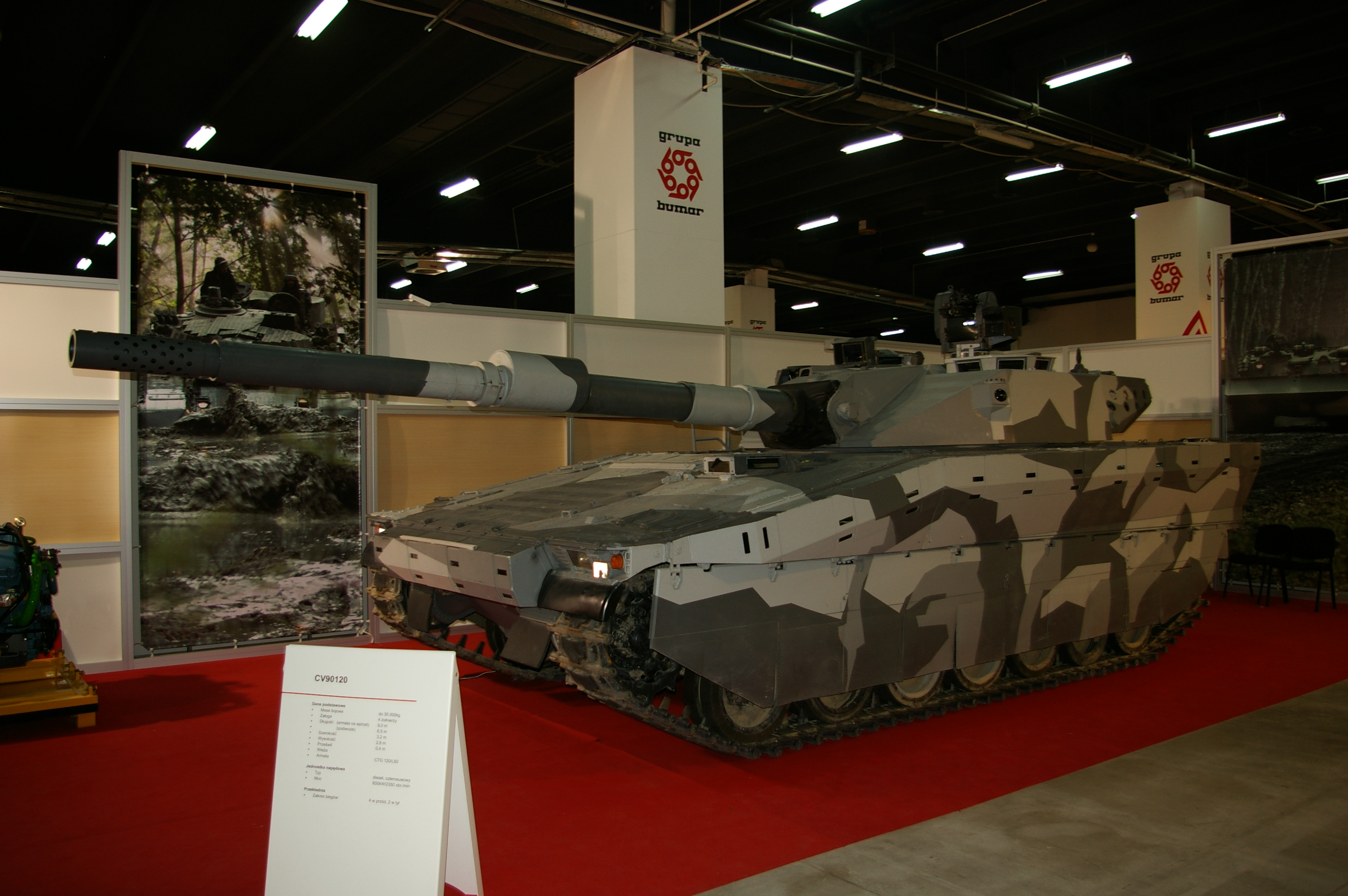
CV90120-T prototype, from which PL-01 mockup was developed

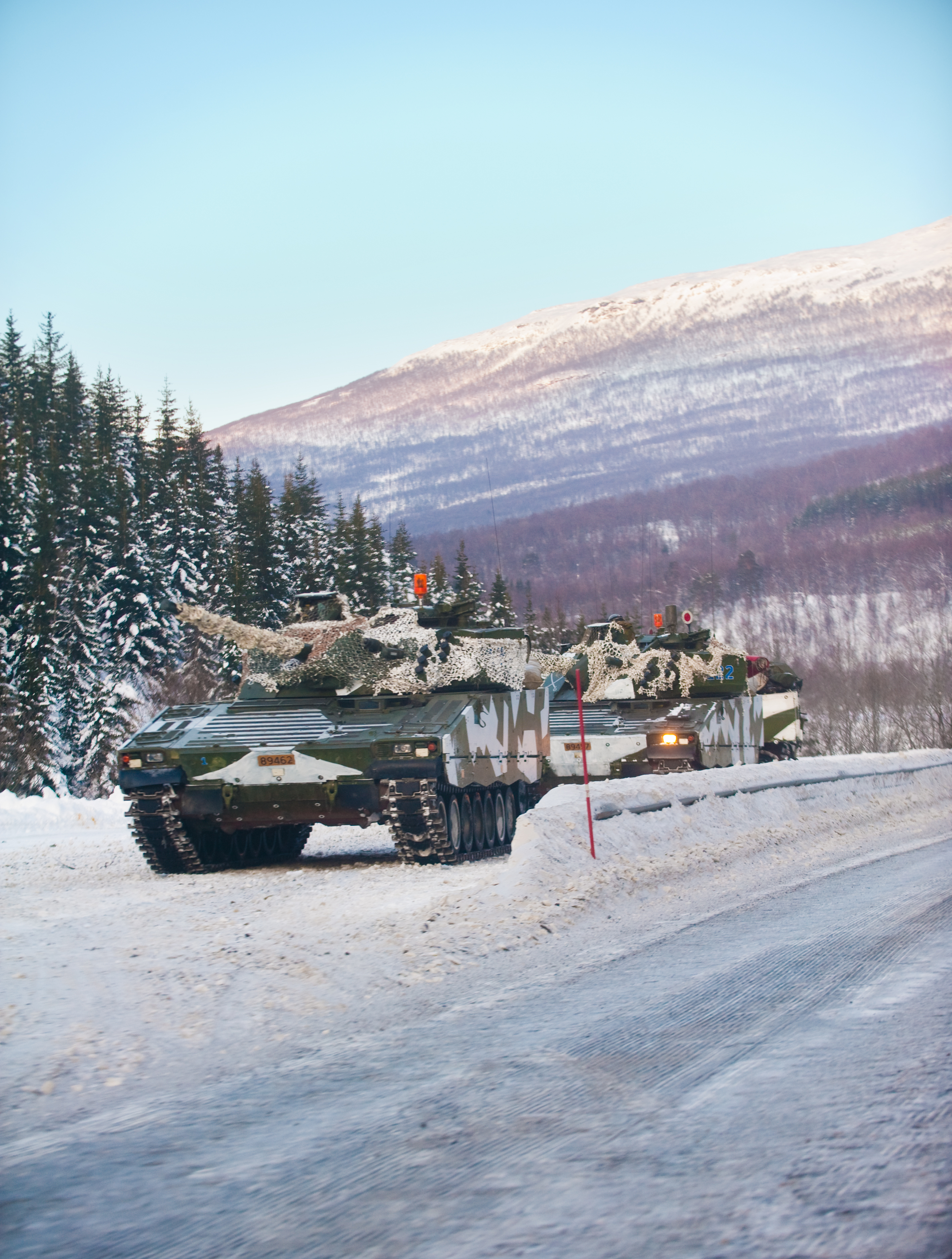
Estonia has purchased 79 CV90s from Norway and the Netherlands

=== CV9030 ===
Export version with a 30 mm Bushmaster II autocannon. Adopted by Norway, Switzerland and Finland. Within BAE Systems Hägglunds, the original version of the Norwegian CV9030N is known as the CV90 Mk I. The Finnish CV9030FIN and Swiss CV9030CH vehicles are known as the CV90 Mk II. The CV90 Mk II is also available as CV9030 COM – Command & Control Vehicle. The recently upgraded CV9030N infantry fighting, command and control and reconnaissance vehicles for Norway are known as CV90 Mk IIIb, and this is the most advanced variant currently in service.

=== CV9035 ===
Armed with a Bushmaster III 35/50 cannon. Adopted by the Netherlands as CV9035NL and Denmark as CV9035DK. Within BAE Systems Hägglunds, CV9035 is known as the CV90 Mk III.
The armour of the Dutch variant consists of a roof protection supplied by RUAG, the RoofPRO-P. It protects against sub-munitions, and all 186 vehicles ordered were equipped with it. 100 vehicles received a RUAG SidePRO armour.

=== CV90105 ===
Turreted assault gun equipped with a 105 mm rifled tank gun/turret. Initially a 1990s design between Hägglunds (BAE Systems) and GIAT (Nexter), using a TML turret. A newer version from 2014, designated a medium tank, features the Cockerill XC-8 turret.

=== CV90120-T ===
Anti-tank/fire-support vehicle (light/medium tank) fitted with a tank turret equipped with a smoothbore 120 mm gun. (RUAG 120 mm Compact Tank Gun)

=== CV90 CZ ===
Export variant designed in collaboration with VOP CZ marketed to the Czech Republic, manned turret variant.

=== CV90 CZr ===
Export variant designed in collaboration with VOP CZ marketed to the Czech Republic featuring a Kongsberg MCT-30 unmanned, remote controlled turret, a slightly raised hull and periscope system.

=== Armadillo ===
Armoured personnel carrier version built on a modular CV90 Mk III chassis. The CV90 Armadillo can be modified to become a personnel carrier, an ambulance, a command and control centre, a recovery vehicle and many other non-turreted variants at low cost due up to 80% commonality among variants. Currently, only the APC version has been built, with five delivered to Denmark for trials.

=== CV90RWS STING ===
Combat engineering variant built on CV90 Mk I chassis. This vehicle can be outfitted with either a mine plow or a mine roller, and it also has a robotic arm. 28 have been ordered by the Norwegian Army.

=== CV90RWS Multi BK ===
Mortar carrier variant built on a CV90 Mk I chassis. This vehicle is armed with a VingPos Mortar Weapon System outfitted with an 81 mm L16A2 mortar. 24 have been ordered by the Norwegian Army.

=== CV90 STRILED ===
Command variant of the Norwegian Army built on the CV90 Mk III chassis. It is equipped with a standard turret, and the combat compartment received 3 workstations to conduct command tasks for brigade to company level.

=== CV90 Mk IV ===
BAE-developed upgraded variant revealed in January 2018, marketed to the Czech Republic as well as existing customers as an upgrade package. Features include a Scania engine with up to 1,000 horsepower, Perkins X300 transmission, and an increased payload of 2 tonnes. The system also includes BAE's iFighting computer system, which claims to enhance situational awareness, aid decision making, improve ergonomics, and enable autonomous support and remote operation.

=== CV9035NL MLU ===
On 13 January 2021, the Defence Materiel Organisation of the Netherlands Armed Forces signed a contract with BAE Systems Hägglunds for a mid-life update of 128 CV90s of the Royal Netherlands Army, with an option for 19 further vehicles. The MLU project features a wide range of modernisations and improvements. The turret has been completely redesigned and will feature a new main gun installation, a mast-mounted 500 mm extendable electro-optical sensor, Elbit Systems’ Iron Fist LD (Light Decoupled) active protection system, FN MAG general-purpose machine gun in an external pod and a twin missile launcher for Spike LRII anti-tank guided missiles. Furthermore, the CV90s will be equipped with rubber tracks, upgraded cooling, various cybersecurity improvements and updated command and control infrastructure. Construction of the new turrets will be conducted by Dutch firm Van Halteren Defence.

== Combat service ==
=== 2004: Strf 9040C in Liberia ===
First use was by the Swedish UN forces in Liberia 2004, where 13 strf 9040C were deployed.

=== 2007: CV9030N in Afghanistan ===
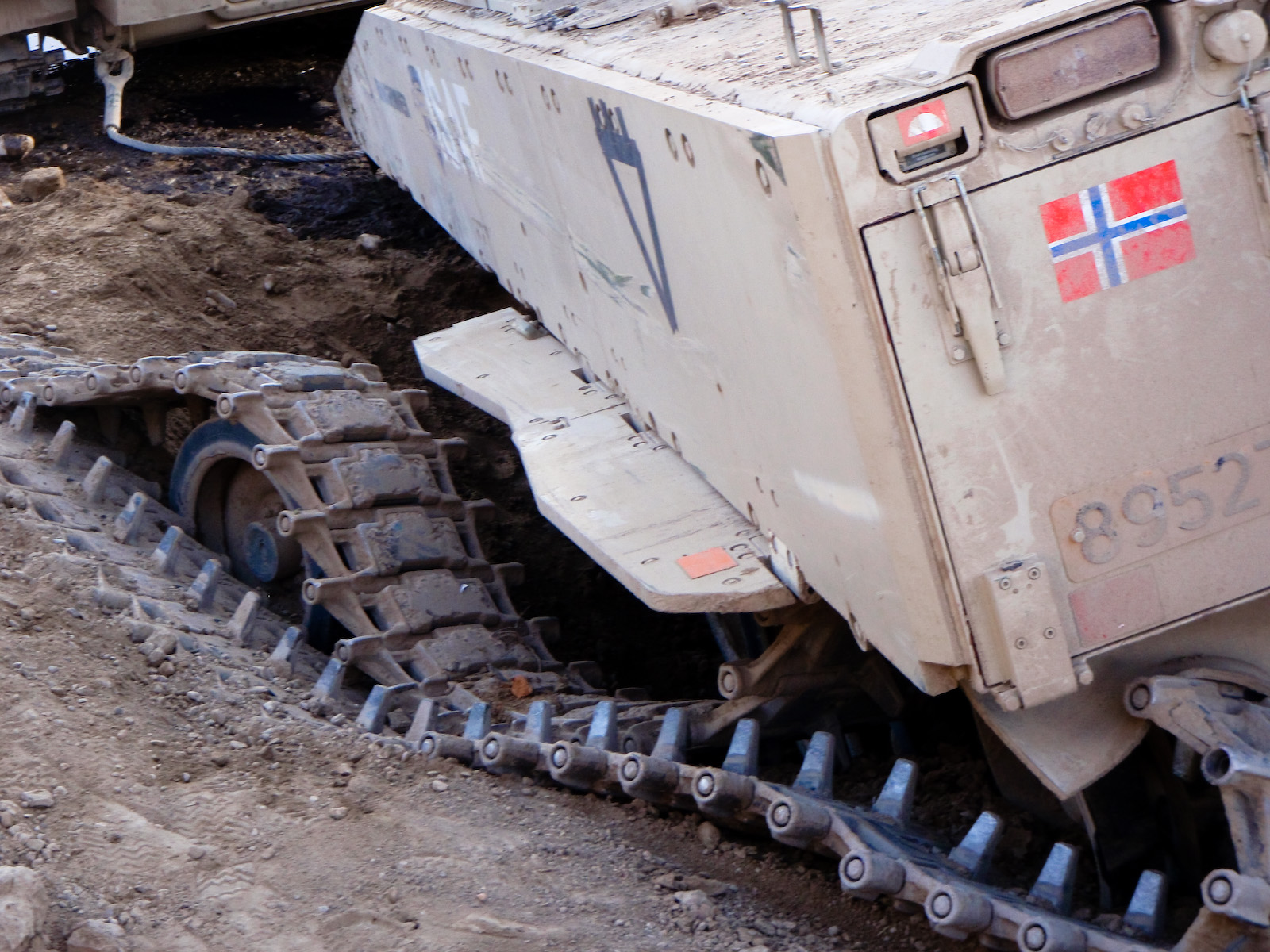
Norwegian CV90 damaged by an IED in Afghanistan

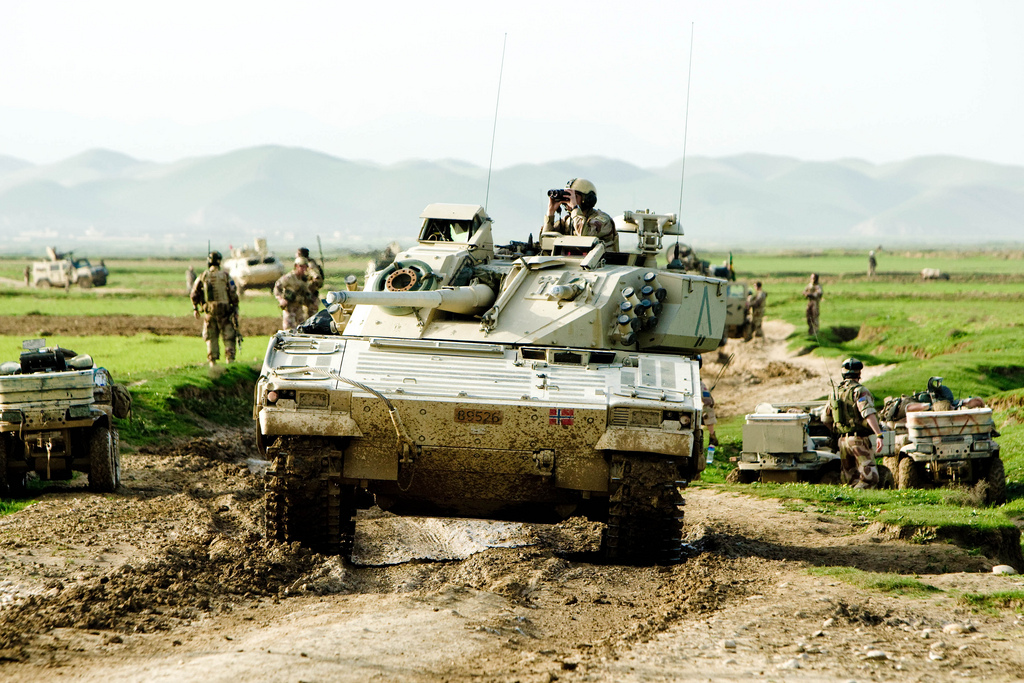
A Norwegian CV9030 during a patrol in Afghanistan.

Since production began in 1993, the CV90 had remained untested in combat until November 2007, when Norwegian Army CV90s from the 2nd Battalion saw heavy combat during Operation Harekate Yolo in Afghanistan. During the first week of November, Norwegian ISAF forces from the 2nd Battalion and Kystjegerkommandoen based in Mazar-e-Sharif, responded to a Taliban attack on Afghan National Army forces in the Ghowrmach district. Having been heavily outnumbered by the Taliban forces, the Norwegians used mortars and, in particular, CV90s, to suppress the attack. The operation left an unknown number of Taliban casualties, but Norwegian news sources say as many as 45 to 65 Taliban fighters may have been killed, and many more wounded.

The CV90 was later used extensively by ISAF forces of the Norwegian Army's Telemark Battalion in May 2008, when the battalion came under heavy machine gun and RPG fire from Taliban fighters during Operation Karez in Badghis Province. The attack left 13 Taliban fighters dead and an unknown number wounded. No allied casualties were reported. In January 2010, a Norwegian soldier was killed when a CV9030 hit a large improvised explosive device in Ghowrmach, Afghanistan.

=== 2010: CV9035DK in Afghanistan ===
In February 2010, Denmark sent ten CV9035DKs to Afghanistan in order to bolster their contingent in Helmand Province. The Danish contingent had suffered numerous casualties since they began operations in the province in the autumn of 2006. The vehicles are from the Danish Royal Lifeguard Regiment, based in the Northern part of Seeland. They are working alongside MOWAG Piranha IIIC, MOWAG Eagle IV, M113 G3DK and Leopard 2A5DK vehicles, all contributed by Denmark, in the Helmand Province. By April 2010, two of the ten vehicles had been hit with IEDs, in both cases protecting the crew and passengers from personal injury. The vehicles lost two wheels and tracks, and were sent back to the manufacturer in Sweden for further investigation. On 7 August 2010, a CV9035DK hit an IED in Afghanistan, killing two soldiers and wounding another three. The explosion was so powerful that the vehicle was turned over.

=== 2023–present: CV9040C in Ukraine ===
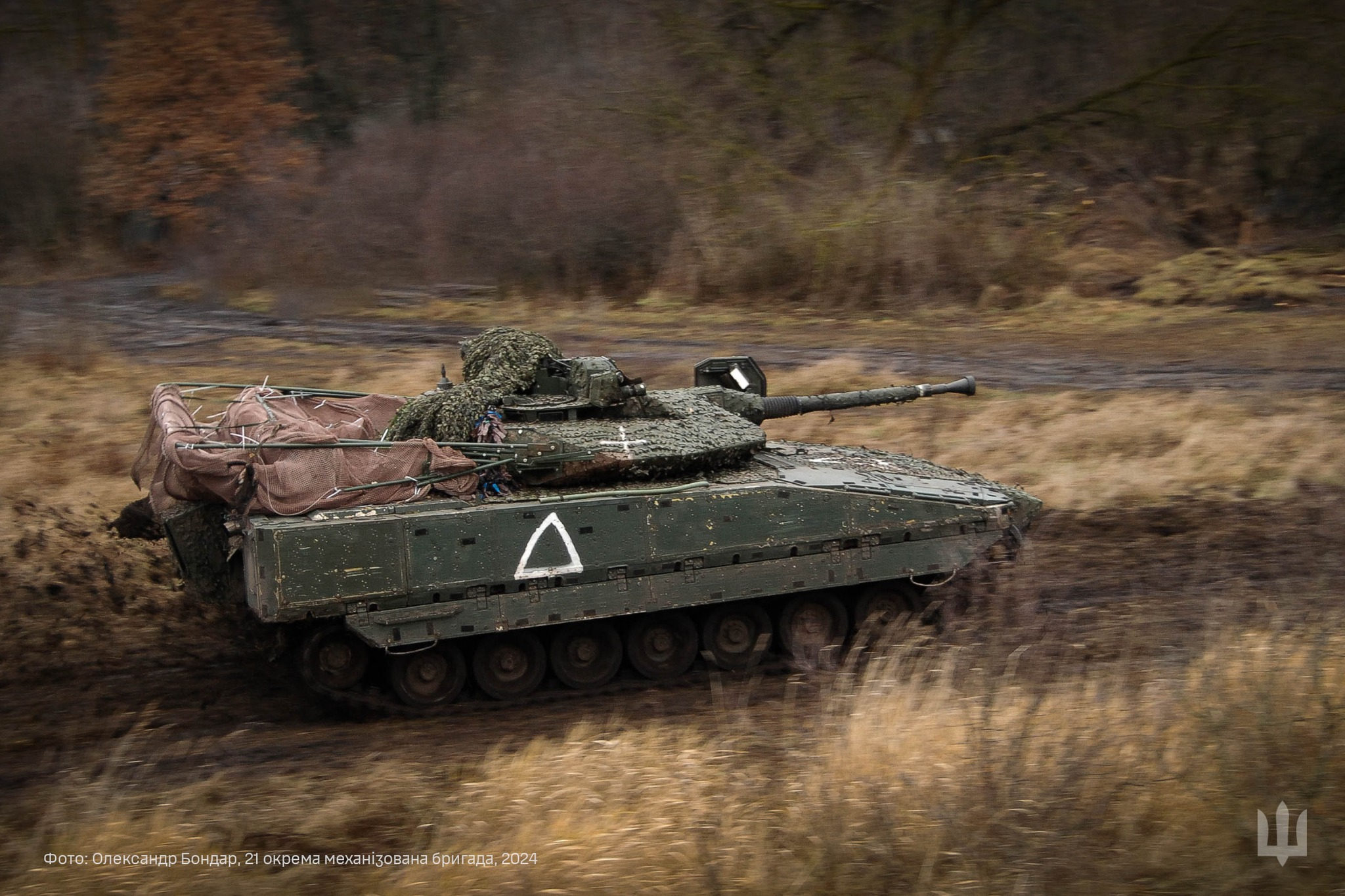
A CV90 in service with the Ukrainian 21st Mechanized Brigade

On 19 January 2023, the Swedish Prime Minister had announced the transfer of up to 50 CV9040Cs to Ukraine to aid against the Russian invasion of the country.

It was reported in late June 2023 that CV90s had arrived at the front line, reportedly somewhere around Bakhmut in the eastern Donbas region. The arrival of the vehicles was reported as a "significant boost" to the Ukrainian firepower. In July, Forbes reported that the Russian Army had knocked out the first CV90, hitting the side of the vehicle with a rocket-propelled grenade. The people on board apparently bailed out of the damaged vehicle. Both videos and photos of the event circulated online. By mid-September, three CV90s had suffered battle damage and one was damaged and captured but no Ukrainian crew members or embarked infantry had been killed. As of 14 April 2025, 25 CV9040C have been visually lost, 11 destroyed, 10 damaged or abandoned and 4 captured.

CV90s were reported to have been deployed by the Ukrainian 93rd Mechanized Brigade in the city of Vovchansk in anticipation of a Russian assault as part of the 2024 Kharkiv offensive.

== Operators ==
Operators: Current Future

=== Current operators ===
Denmark
45 CV9035DKs purchased.
10 have been upgraded to international operations. In March 2024, a contract for a MLU (mid-life upgrade) was signed by the Defence Acquisition and Logistics Organisation of the Army.

Estonia
44 CV9035NLs purchased from the Netherlands in December 2014, and now referred to as CV9035EE. The first delivery took place in 2016. That same year, Estonia struck a deal with Norway to purchase an additional 37 surplus Mk I hulls to be rebuilt as support vehicles by the end of 2023. These will be equipped with the Protector RS4 RWS able to fire Javelin missiles. Deliveries from the Netherlands were completed on 1 April 2019.
Finland
102 CV9030FINs (57 first batch, 45 second batch), which are unique in that they are equipped with a coaxial PKMT machine gun.
Netherlands

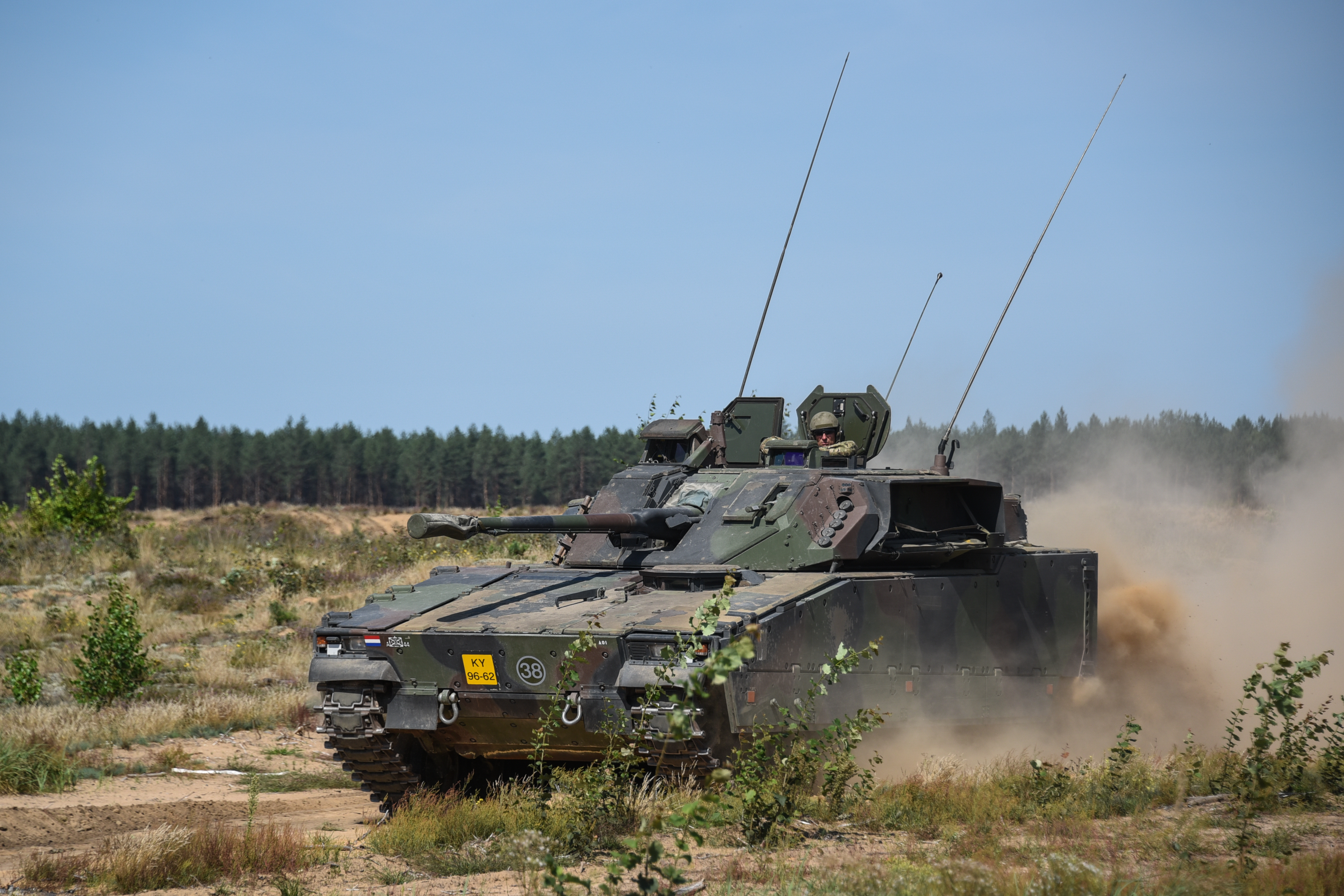
Dutch CV9035NL

128 CV9035NLs (initial order of 184 vehicles raised to 193). Deliveries were completed in 2011. In December 2014, 44 CV9035NL were sold to Estonia. During 2021 an order for a Mid Life Upgrade of 128 CV9035NL was placed where among other the Spike LRII anti-tank guided missile where integrated. On 11 June 2024, an order was placed for 15 Mjolner self-propelled mortar systems based on CV90, scheduled to be delivered by 2028.
Norway
104 CV9030N were purchased in 1994, based on the CV90 MkI chassis. Among these, 17 were upgraded for international missions with air conditioning, additional mine protection, rubber tracks and rear-view cameras, and were designated CV9030NF1, one of which was damaged in Afghanistan and not repaired.
In April 2012, the Norwegian Government decided to modernise and expand the fleet to 144 CV90.
- 110 new Mk III hulls were manufactured for 3 variants, all equipped with a turret: 74 IFV, 21 reconnaissance and 15 command (CV90 STRILED)
  - 103 turrets were reused and modernised to the MkIII standard
  - 7 additional turrets were manufactured to the MkIII standard
- 34 MkI hulls were reused and modernised, and became 3 variants: 16 combat engineering vehicles (CV90RWS STING), 16 multi-role / mortar (CV90RWS Multi BK), and 2 driver training vehicles.
- 69 MkI hulls were mothballed
In 2014, Estonia struck a deal with Norway to purchase 37 surplus Mk I hulls.
On 18 February 2021, it was announced that Norway had ordered another 12 combat engineering vehicles (CV90RWS STING) and 8 multi-role vehicles (CV90RWS Multi BK), all based on the MkI hulls that remained in reserve.
Slovakia
The Slovak military and BAE Systems Hägglunds signed a contract worth €1.3 billion for the acquisition of 152 CV90 Mk IV on 12 December 2022. The contract includes 122 IFV variants armed with a 35 mm autocannon and SPIKE-LR anti-tank guided missiles, as well as the Iron Fist active protection system. Other variants ordered by the Slovak army include command and control, engineering and recovery vehicles based on the CV90
The first delivery took place in 2026.
Sweden
499 vehicles, of different variants - a total of 549 was ordered but around 50 were donated to Ukraine. In 2016, a contract was signed for a MLU of 288 CV9040s of the A and B version. New designation will be D1 and D2. In February 2022 and in January 2023, the Swedish Army ordered a batch of additional 20+20 CV90 Mjölner mortar systems. In December 2024, Sweden ordered another 50 CV90s as replacements for the ones sent to Ukraine. In April 2025, the Nordic countries announced that several hundred CV90s would be ordered from BAE Hägglunds.
Switzerland
186 CV9030CH, 154 IFV and 32 command posts. The order had an option for 124 additional CV9030CH that wasn't confirmed. Delivery: 1 in 2001, 9 in 2002, 65 in 2003, 68 in 2004, 43 in 2005. In 2020, a life extension was initiated for all 186 CV90's in Swiss service. With the life extension program completed, the CV90 will be able to be in service to at least 2040
Ukraine
Sweden has donated 50 CV9040C to Ukraine as part of its support to counter the Russian invasion. They were delivered in June 2023.

=== Future operators and orders ===
Czech Republic
On 24 May 2023, BAE Systems Hägglunds and the Czech military signed a contract worth $2.2 billion for the acquisition of 246 CV90 Mk IV infantry fighting vehicles in seven different variants. Negotiations for the new infantry fighting vehicles had been coordinated with Slovakia, which had also recently selected the CV90 Mk IV.
Denmark
In August 2024, Denmark agreed to purchase 115 additional CV90 vehicles, the model is the same as Sweden ordered in 2024, the CV9035 Mk IIIC. The deal is valued at €1.35 billion (DKK 9.975 billion).
In November 2025, 44 additional CV90 of the CV9035 Mk IIIC variant were ordered.
Netherlands
Additional CV 90 are to be purchased by the Netherlands.
Nordic Initiative
Multilateral agreement signed in November 2025 for a common purchase of the CV90. The confirmed orders through this initiative are:
Lithuania
In October 2024, based on the military advice, the State Defence Council decided to begin the CV90 acquisition process.
The order was confirmed in December 2025, with 100 CV90 Mk IV to start being delivered in 2028.
Sweden
Replacement order for the 50 CV9040C donated to Ukraine. A preliminary design order for procurement of the CV9035 Mk IIIC has been placed, to be able to place a series order in early 2024. The CV9035 Mk IIIC is to be ordered to use the assembly line already in place for the upgrade of the CV9035NL, and therefore speed up the procurement process. A future order of a variant of the CV90 Mk IV will be placed on a later date to expand the Swedish numbers of CV90's in use. The details of the contract were made public in December 2024, the order is made with Denmark (115) and with Ukraine (40) financed by Norway, Sweden and the Netherlands, all of it for €2.2 billion.
Ukraine
In 2024, several countries decided to collaborate to supply new CV90's to Ukraine. The initiative was launched by Denmark and Sweden, later joined by the Netherlands. Netherlands Ministry of Defence spokesman Kaj Leers said the Dutch government expects to partly produce at least 180 of the vehicles.
The investments in this initiative are the following:
- €400 million from the Netherlands (June 2024)
- DKK 1.8 billion (USD $264 million) by Denmark (December 2023)
40 CV90 MkIIIC were ordered in December 2024.

=== Potential operators and orders ===
Brazil
During the summer of 2023, BAE Systems showcased the CV90 to the Brazilian army. As part of its VBC Fuz programme the Brazilian army is looking at procuring 78 tracked infantry fighting vehicles.
Nordic Initiative
Multilateral agreement signed in November 2025 for a common purchase of hundreds of CV90. The signatories that haven't confirmed yet their order are:

Finland
Finland joined the agreement in November. It would succeed to the 110 BMP-2MD.
Netherlands
The Netherlands announced in December 2025 that a new batch of CV90 would be acquired with other allies.
Norway (~80)
The Norwegian Army plans to order additional IFV, command vehicles and reconnaissance vehicles for the 4th mechanised brigade (Finnmark Brigade). It aims at protecting the Norwegian border with Russia, and it should be fully equipped by 2032. The budget estimate is of 2.0 to 3.5 billion Kroner.
As per the new investment plan, it is defined as the Project Number 1116.
As of 2025, the quantity estimated to be purchased is 80 vehicles.
Sweden
Sweden plans to purchase additional CV90.

Slovakia
Slovakia started considering the purchase of CV90120-T in January 2025, due to the cost of new main battle tanks.
Ukraine
Ukraine to buy up to 1,000 CV90. On 16 June 2023, Ukraine signed a joint declaration with Slovakia and the Czech Republic to collaborate for the acquisition and the operational aspect of the CV90 Mk IV. On 10 September 2023, Ukrainian Deputy Defence Minister Hanna Maliar said Ukraine and Sweden had agreed on a joint production, mentioning 1,000 vehicles as a goal, without providing any further details.

=== Evaluation-only users ===
Canada
1 CV9035 Mark III. A combination of budget cuts and upgrades to the existing fleet of LAV IIIs led the Canadian Army to cancel the procurement of light combat vehicles, in which BAE Systems Hägglunds was offering its CV90.
Estonia
As part of the Nordic initiative, Estonia was planning to order CV90 Mk IV IFV, but decided in April 2026 to focus on other capabilities.
Poland
The CV90120T was on trials in 2007 and later rebuilt into the PL-01.
United Kingdom
The CV90 competed with the Scout SV as part of Future Rapid Effect System.
United States
The CV90 was a contender for the US Army's cancelled Next-Generation Combat Vehicle program for the replacement of the M2 and M3 Bradley.

=== Summary ===
Operators February 2026)	Base variant	Orders	Delivery of produced CV90 (primary user) num: to be produced and delivered num: modified in other variant								Bought 2nd hand [ + ] Sold 2nd hand [ − ]	Donation [ + / − ]	Losses and reserve	In service
Operators February 2026)	Base variant	Orders	IFV	Mortar	Artillery Obs.	SPAAG	Command variant	Recovery / Engineering	RECCE	Other	Bought 2nd hand [ + ] Sold 2nd hand [ − ]	Donation [ + / − ]	Losses and reserve	In service
Sweden	Strf 9040	589	354	40 (+40)	42	30	56	26	0	1	0	−50	0	499
Sweden	CV9035 Mk IIIC	50	0 (+50)	0	0	0	0	0	0	0	0	0	0	0
(Danish Realm) Denmark	CV9035DK Mk III	45	45	0	0	0	0	0	0	0	0	0	−1	44
(Danish Realm) Denmark	CV9035DK Mk IIIC	159	0 (+159)	0	0	0	0	0	0	0	0	0	0	0
Estonia	CV9035NL Mk III + CV9030N Mk I	0	0	0	0	0	0	0	0	0	+44 +37	0	0	81
Finland	CV9030FIN Mk II	102	102	0	0	0	0	0	0	0	0	0	0	102
Lithuania	CV90 Mk IV	100	0 (+100)	0	0	0	0	0	0	0	0	0	0	0
Netherlands	CV9035NL Mk III	193	187 (-15)	0 (+15)	0	0	0	0	0	6	−44	0	−6 (reserve)	143
Norway	CV9030N Mk I	104	104 (-54)	0 (+24)	0	0	0	0 (+24)	0	0 (+2)	−37	0	−13 (1 loss / 12 reserve)	54
Norway	CV9030N Mk IIIb	110	74	0	0	0	15	0	21	0	0	0	0	110
Switzerland	CV9030CH Mk II	186	154	0	0	0	32	0	0	0	0	0	0	186
Ukraine	CV9030N Mk I	0	0	0	0	0	0	0	0	0	0	+50	−25	25
Ukraine	CV9035 Mk IIIC	40	0 (+40)	0	0	0	0	0	0	0	0	0	0	0
(Czech Republic) Czechia	CV9030CZ Mk IV	246	0 (+141)	0	0 (+12)	0	0 (+31)	0 (+28)	0 (+18)	0 (+16)	0	0	0	0
Slovakia	CV9035SK Mk IV	152	1 (+121)	0	0	0	0 (+15)	0 (+3)	0 (+9)	0 (+3)	0	0	0	1
Total		2,076	1,021 (+611)	40 (+40)	42 (+12)	30 –	103 (+46)	26 (+31)	21 (+27)	7 (+19)	0	0	−45	1,245
Total		2,076	1,290 (+787)								0	0	−45	1,245

== Specifications of variants (domestic) ==
Comparison of specifications
	Strf 9040	Strf 9040A	Strf 9040B	Strf 9040C	E/Stri90	Lvkv90	Bgbv90
Total weight (tons)	22.8	23.1		27.6	22.4	24	23.2
Length	6.47 m (21 ft 3 in)	6.55 m (21 ft 6 in)		7.00 m (23 ft 0 in)	6.55 m (21 ft 6 in)	6.55 m (21 ft 6 in)	7.9 m (25 ft 11 in)
Width	3.10 m (10 ft 2 in)	3.17 m (10 ft 5 in)		3.42 m (11 ft 3 in)	3.17 m (10 ft 5 in)	3.17 m (10 ft 5 in)	3.17 m (10 ft 5 in)
Height	2.5 m (8 ft 2 in)	2.71 m (8 ft 11 in)		2.75 m (9 ft 0 in)	2.71 m (8 ft 11 in)	3.45 m (11 ft 4 in)	2.65 m (8 ft 8 in)
Ground clearance (m)	0.45	0.45		0.36	0.45	0.45	0.45
Crew	3	3		3	3	7	4
Soldier/seats	8	6–7		6–7	6		
Main armament	Bofors 40 mm L/70B with 234 rounds	Bofors 40 mm L/70Bc with 234 rounds		Bofors 40 mm L/70Bc with 120 rounds		Bofors 40 mm L/70Bb with 234 rounds	
Secondary armament	7.62 mm Ksp m/39B machine gun	Ksp m/39C		7.62 mm Ksp 58 machine gun	Ksp m/39C	Ksp m/39C	Ksp m/39C
Defensive equipment	Smoke dischargers 6× Galix						
Additional equipment	Lyran illuminating mortar 2×						
Gun elevation (degrees)		−8 +35	−8 +27	−8 +27		−8 +50	
Engine	Scania DSI 14 turbodiesel V8						
Gearbox	Allison/Perkins X-300-5 Automatic						

== See also ==
- Lynx – (Germany)
- ASCOD – (Spain, Austria)
- Bionix – (Singapore)
- BMP-3 – (Soviet Union, Russia)
- BTR-4 – (Ukraine)
- Dardo – (Italy)
- ZBD-04 – (China)
- K21 – (South Korea)
- M2 Bradley – (United States)
- Puma – (Germany)
- Type 89 – (Japan)
- Ajax – (United Kingdom)
- Makran – (Iran)
- Tulpar (IFV) – (Turkey)
