= PL-01 =

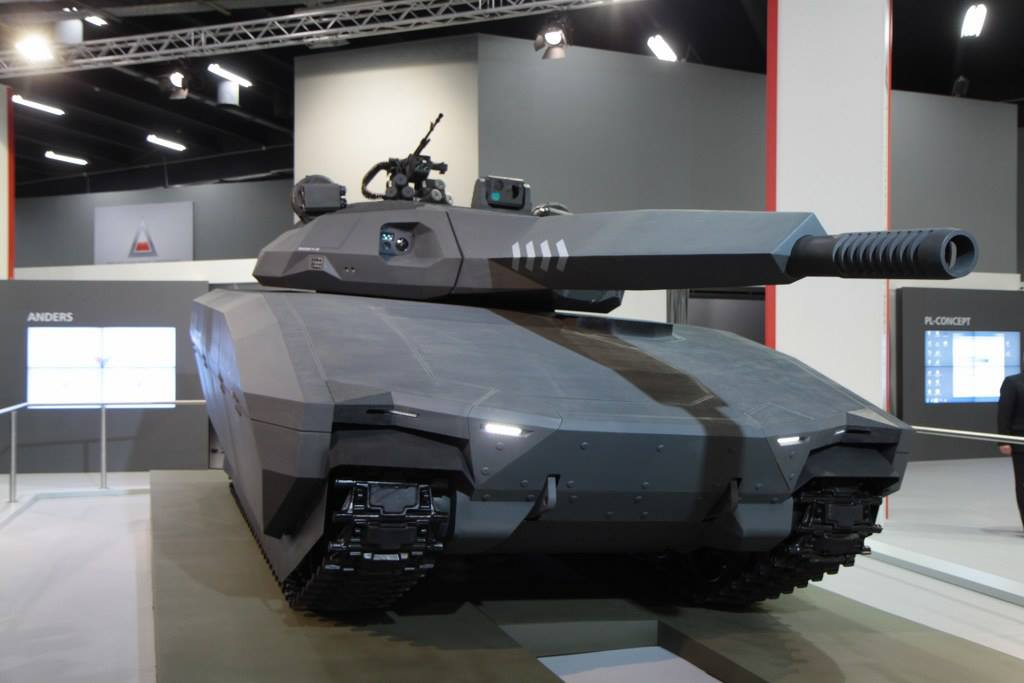
- The PL-01 concept vehicle at the International Defence Industry Exhibition in 2013
- Type: Light tank
- Place of origin: Poland

Production history
- Designer: OBRUM; BAE Systems
- Designed: 2013-2015
- Manufacturer: OBRUM
- No. built: Unknown

Specifications
- Mass: 30 t (30 long tons; 33 short tons) standard layout; 35 t (34 long tons; 39 short tons) with additional armour panels
- Length: 7.0 m (23 ft 0 in)
- Width: 3.8 m (12 ft 6 in)
- Height: 2.8 m (9 ft 2 in)
- Crew: 3
- Armor: Same as baseline CV90
- Main armament: 1 × 105 mm or 120 mm caliber main cannon
- Secondary armament: 1 × 7.62 mm machine gun
- Engine: Diesel engine 700 kW (940 hp)
- Suspension: Torsion bar
- Operational range: 500 km (310 mi) on paved roads; 250 km (160 mi) on rough terrain
- Maximum speed: 70 km/h (43 mph) on paved roads; 50 km/h (31 mph) on rough terrain

The PL-01 was a Polish light tank concept created by OBRUM with support from BAE Systems, based on the Swedish CV90120-T light tank. The concept vehicle was first unveiled at the International Defence Industry Exhibition in Kielce on 2 September 2013, but the project was scrapped in 2015.

== Design ==
The layout of the PL-01 would have been similar to modern standard main battle tanks. The driver would have been located at the front of the vehicle's hull, with the commander and gunner also located in the hull and the unmanned turret mounted in the rear. In addition, there was to be a rear compartment in the hull that could have accommodated four soldiers. The vehicle chassis would have been based on that of the Combat Vehicle 90.

The vehicle armor would have had a modular ceramic-aramid shell, designed to provide protection compatible with NATO standard STANAG 4569 Annex A at level 5+ across the front portions of the hull and turret. Additional armor panels would have been mounted on the turret and hull to provide full protection against a range of projectiles. The hull of the vehicle was planned to provide protection against improvised explosive devices (IEDs) and landmines in accordance with appendix B parts 4a and 4b of the STANAG 4569 standard. The entire vehicle was to be covered with radiation-absorbent material to create a stealth ground vehicle.

The PL-01 was to be equipped with a 700 kilowatts (940 hp) diesel engine coupled to a torque converter, automatic gearbox, and driving assistance mechanism. The suspension was based on seven wheels, with the drive shafts having active damping of torsion bars mounted on the first and last two pairs. The vehicle could have reached speeds of up to 70 kilometres per hour (43 mph) on paved roads and 50 kilometres per hour (31 mph) in rough terrain with a maximum range of 500 kilometres (310 mi). It could have successfully climbed an inclination of 30 degrees, cross ditches and trenches to a width of 2.6 metres (8 ft 6 in), and cross water obstacles with a depth of up to 1.5 metres (4 ft 11 in) without preparation, and up to 5 metres (16 ft) deep with preparation.

== Weapons ==
The primary weapon of the PL-01 was planned to be a 105 mm or 120 mm cannon fitted within the unmanned turret, in accordance with NATO standards. The cannon would have been able to shoot both conventional projectiles and guided anti-tank missiles. It was to have an automatic loader for its main cannon, which would ensure a fire rate of 6 shots per minute. The vehicle would have been able to carry 45 rounds, 16 of which would have been stored within the turret and ready to fire, with the remainder stored within the chassis compartment. The tank was also planned to be armed with a 7.62 mm UKM-2000C machine gun with an ammunition supply of 1,000 rounds.

Additional equipment would have been installed in a remote-controlled module. Planned designs included a 7.62 mm or 12.7 mm machine gun or a 40 mm automatic grenade launcher with a supply of 8,000 rounds of 7.62 mm, 400 rounds of 12.7 mm or 96 rounds of 40 mm grenades. Also built into the turret is an active protection system which intercepts incoming missiles, and smoke grenade launchers.

All equipment were to be electronically stabilized, and observation and sighting systems would have come with laser rangefinders, day-night cameras, and third-generation thermal imaging, with visual data displayed on a screen.

== Equipment ==
The PL-01 would have been fitted with a fire extinguishing system in the turret and hull, an internal radio communication system, an active anti-projectile protection system, a battlefield management system, a cooling exhaust system, a thermal masking system, and air conditioning filters. The crew would have been provided with special seats to minimize the physical effects of nearby explosions. In addition, the vehicle may have been equipped with a satellite navigation system and friend-foe identification system.

== Variants ==
In addition to its direct fire role, the vehicle was planned to be able to be configured as a command vehicle, mine clearance vehicle, or armored vehicle repair.
