= Adaptiv =

Active camouflage system

An armoured vehicle fitted with 'Adaptiv' infrared side panels, switched off (left), and on to simulate a large car (right), demonstrates both crypsis and mimesis.

Adaptiv is an active camouflage technology developed by BAE Systems AB to protect military vehicles from detection by far infrared night vision devices, providing infrared stealth. It consists of an array of hexagonal Peltier plates which can be rapidly heated and cooled to form any desired image, such as of the natural background or of a non-target object. Its goal is to develop stealth ground vehicles.

== Technology ==
In 2011, BAE Systems announced their Adaptiv infrared military camouflage technology, likening it to "a thermal TV screen". It uses about 1000 hexagonal panels to cover the sides of an armoured vehicle such as a tank or personnel carrier. Infrared cameras continuously gather thermal images of the vehicle's surroundings. The Peltier plate panels are rapidly heated and cooled to match either the temperature of the background, such as a forest, or one of the objects in the thermal cloaking system's "library" such as a truck, car or large rock. The system is able to gather and display thermal images while the vehicle is moving. The result is to "cloak" the vehicle from detection by heat-detecting night vision devices (thermographic camera systems).

For crypsis, the panels can display an infrared image of the vehicle's background; this can be updated as the vehicle moves. For mimesis, an image of a chosen object, such as a car, can be retrieved from Adaptiv's library and superimposed on the background. The illustration shows Adaptiv mimicking a four-wheel drive car, using part of the panel, while the rest of the panel is cryptic, imitating the natural background. The technology is said to reduce the range at which a vehicle would be detected to less than 500 metres.

The panels forming Adaptiv's pixels are hexagons approximately 5.5 inches (14 cm) wide. They are robust, contributing to the armour of the vehicle that carries them. The system allows its operator to "grab" a thermal image from a vehicle or other object for display.

Adaptiv was developed by BAE Systems AB's survivability programme at Örnsköldsvik, Sweden, initially for Combat Vehicle 90 infantry fighting vehicles. The company has developed a lighter version which has been tested on helicopters. A version for ships could in principle use larger panels. A somewhat similar system was prototyped to an early stage by the Israeli company Eltics in 2010.
