= Landsverk L-30 =

Landsverk L-30 Stridsvagn fm/31 (strv fm/31)
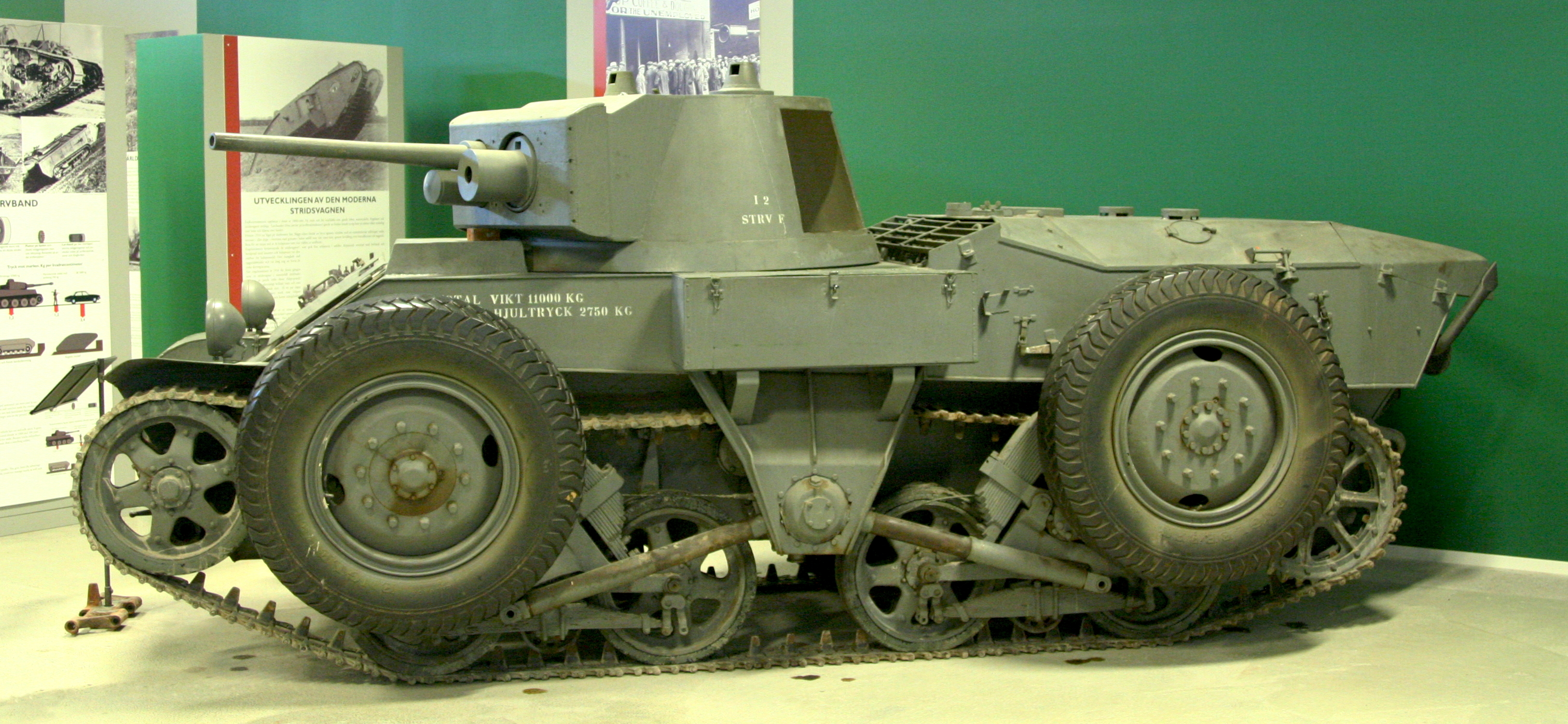
- Sole stridsvagn fm/31 (Landsverk L-30) prototype on display at Swedish Tank Museum Arsenalen.
- Type: Wheel-cum-track medium tank
- Place of origin: Sweden

Service history
- In service: 1935–1940
- Used by: Sweden

Production history
- Designer: AB Landsverk
- Designed: 1930–1935
- Manufacturer: AB Landsverk
- Produced: 1935
- No. built: 1

Specifications
- Mass: 11,500 kg (25,400 lb)
- Length: 5.20 m (17 ft 1 in)
- Width: 2.45 m (8 ft 0 in)
- Height: 2.22 m (7 ft 3 in) – on tracks 2.50 m (8 ft 2 in) – on wheels
- Crew: 3–4
- Armor: 8–14 mm (0.31 in – 0.55 in)
- Main armament: 1 × Bofors 37 mm AT-gun L/45 (37 mm kan fm/32)
- Secondary armament: 2 × Browning M1917 (6.5 mm ksp m/14-29)
- Engine: Maybach DSO 8; 150 hp (110 kW)
- Operational range: 300 kilometres (190 mi)
- Maximum speed: 35 km/h (22 mph) – on tracks 75 km/h (47 mph) – on wheels

Landsverk L-30 (Swedish Army designation: stridsvagn försöksmodell 1931, abbr. strv fm/31, "tank trial model-1931") was a Swedish late interwar era medium tank constructed by AB Landsverk for the Swedish Army between 1930 and 1935, featuring welded armour joints and a "wheel-cum-track system", allowing for interchangeable wheeled and tracked propulsion.

== Construction ==
The L-30 was based on the Landsverk L-10, a conventional fully tracked tank, but added to the design by featuring deployable wheel propulsion in addition to its tracks (a so-called "wheel-cum-track system"), the idea being that wheeled and tracked propulsion could be interchanged depending on the travel surface: road/terrain. The wheel-track suspension design was quite ingenious, and wheels/tracks could be interchanged in less than a minute, even while on the move.

Beyond the wheel-track suspension, it was almost identical to the Landsverk L-10 design, featuring an advanced all-welded construction, using periscopes for visibility rather than view slits. The Landsverk L-10 design was the first tank produced to feature an all-welded construction. While the L-30 prototype was unarmed, the production design featured a turret mounted Bofors 37 mm anti-tank gun L/45 (37 mm kanon fm/32) and two Browning M1917 machine guns (6.5 mm kulspruta m/14-29), one coaxial mounted in the turret and one flexible mounted in the hull, and was equipped with 8–14 mm (0.31 in – 0.55 in) of armour.

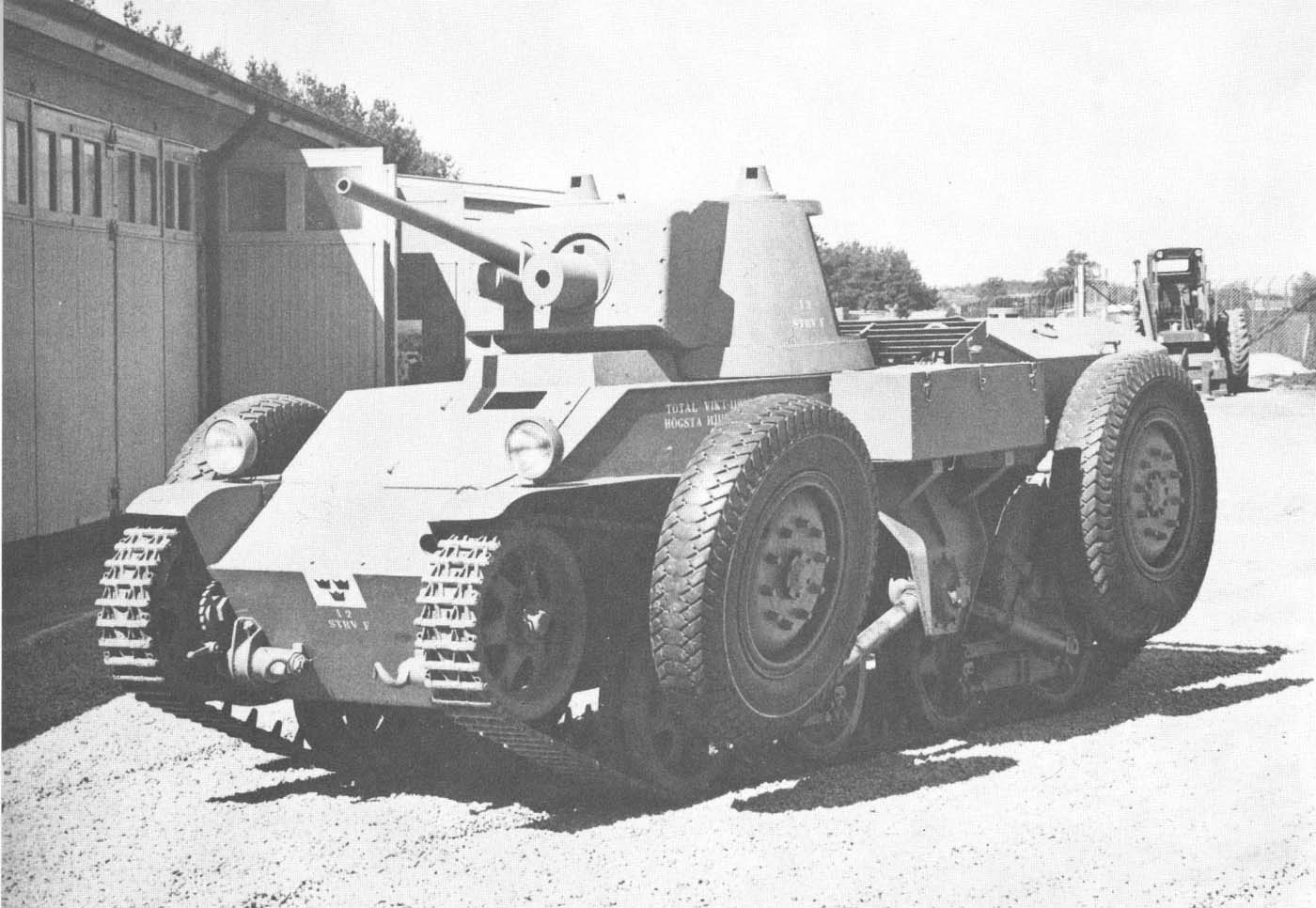
Landsverk L-30 (strv fm/31) in tracked-mode.

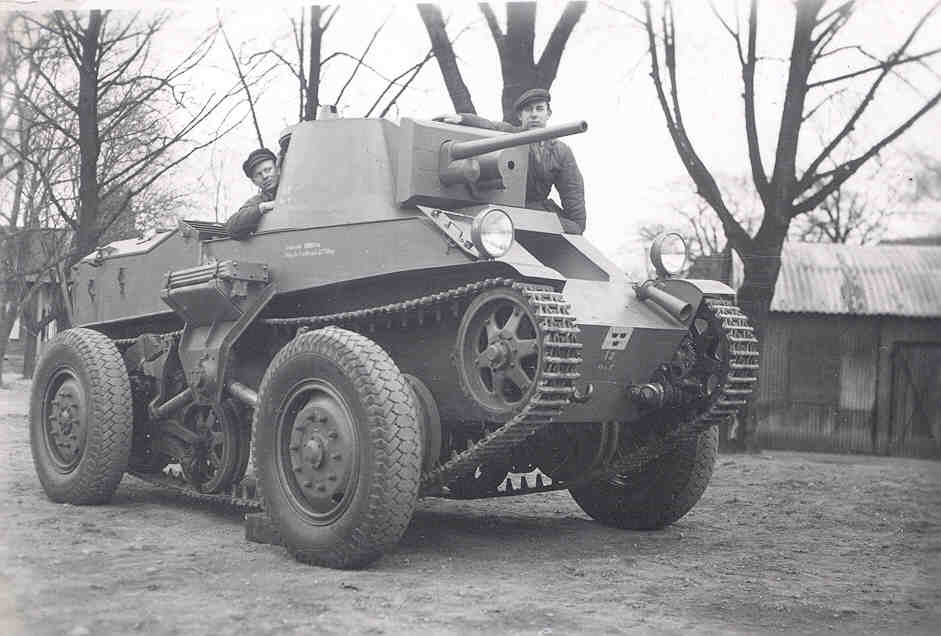
Landsverk L-30 (strv fm/31) in wheeled-mode.

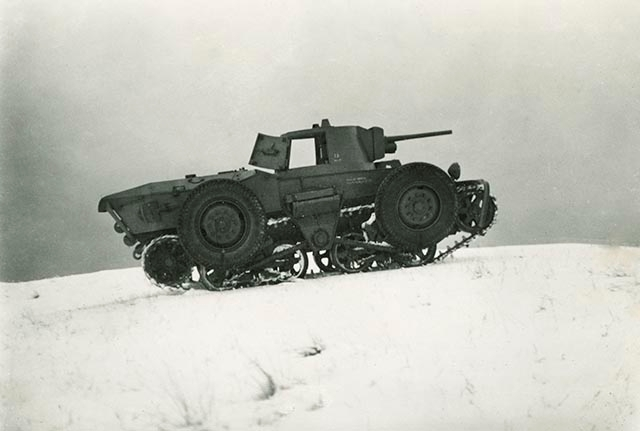
L-30 trials at Landsverk Landskrona, 1935.

== History ==
Development of the L-30 started in 1930 as part of a competition set up by the Royal Swedish Army Materiel Administration (KAF) for the next generation of Swedish tanks. Landsverk competed against designs from AB Bofors (Krupp) and Morgårdshammar AB, evaluation being conducted in the fall the same year. Landsverks designs came out on top and Landsverk was selected as contractor in January 1931. After further in-depth evaluation of Landsverks designs, KAF ordered one L-30 trial vehicle from Landsverk in October 1931, along three Landsverk L-10 test vehicles.

The lone L-30 (designated stridsvagn fm/31: fm = försöksmodell, "trial model") was intended simply for mobility trials and was produced using mild steel from Landsverk, lacking the frontal hull machine gun port of the L-10 and featuring a wooden mockup turret. Production was delayed and the prototype was produced and delivered to the Swedish Army in 1935. Despite being highly advanced for its time, the design was seen as too expensive and specialized, thus in the end it was cancelled in favour of conventional tanks.

== Surviving vehicles ==
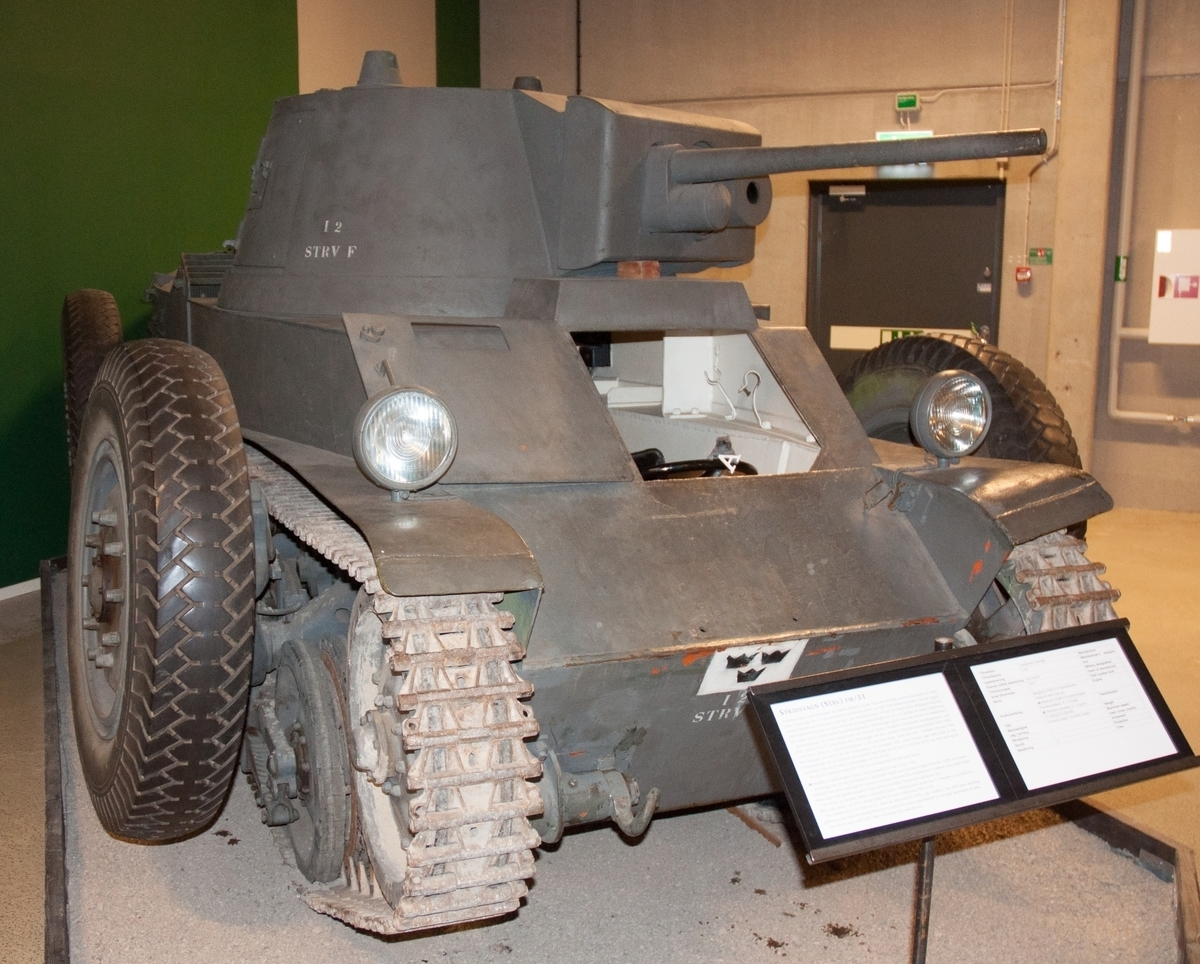
The surviving L-30 (strv fm/31) in Swedish Tank Museum Arsenalens display hall.

The sole L-30 (strv fm/31) prototype has been preserved. It was exhibited at the Swedish Armour Museum in Axvall between 1969 and 2007, then on being moved to the collection of the new Swedish Tank Museum Arsenalen, where it is displayed today.

== Period Landsverk armoured vehicles ==
Example list (incomplete)

Tracked vehicles

- Landsverk L-5
- Landsverk L-10
- Landsverk L-30
- Landsverk L-60
- Landsverk L-62 Anti
- Landsverk L-100
- Landsverk L-101
- Landsverk L-120
- Landsverk Lago

Wheeled vehicles

- Landsverk L-170
- Landsverk L-180
- Landsverk L-181
- Landsverk L-182
- Landsverk L-185
- Landsverk L-210
- Landsverk Lynx

Railroad vehicles

- Landsverk L-310
- Landsverk L-320
- Landsverk L-321
