= Landsverk L-10 =

Swedish interwar medium tank

Landsverk L-10 Stridsvagn m/31 (strv m/31)
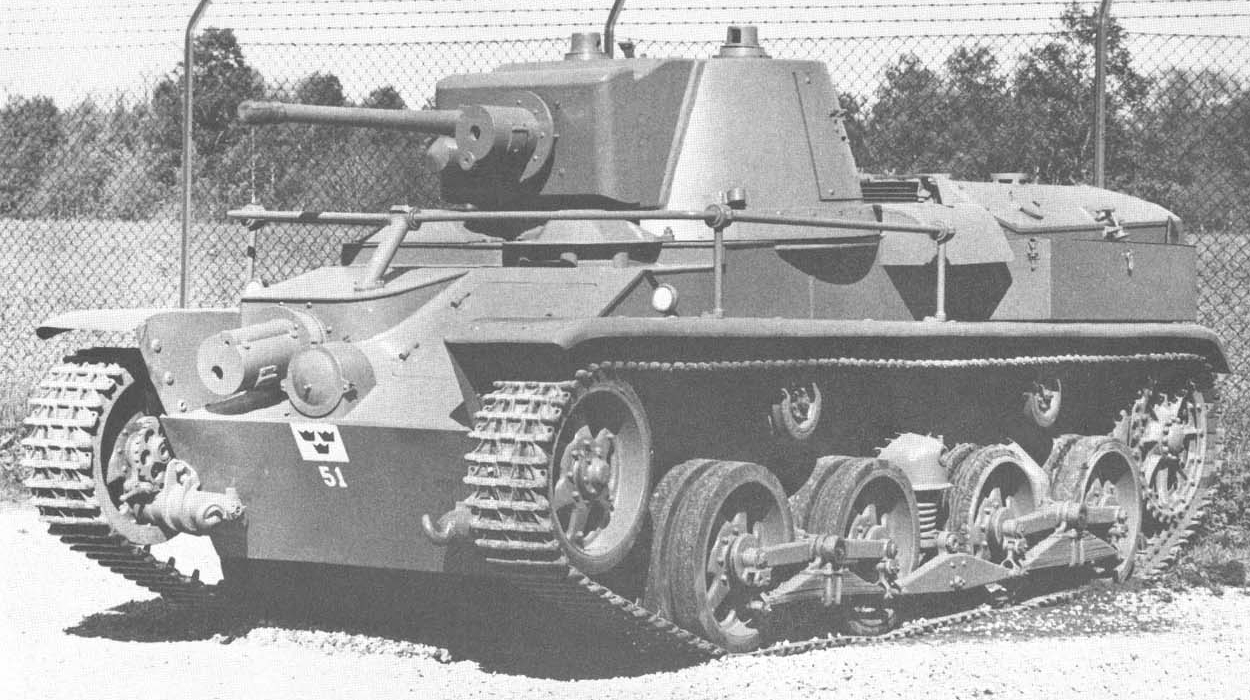
- Stridsvagn m/31 (Landsverk L-10) at Skaraborg Regiment (P4).
- Type: Medium Caterpillar Tank
- Place of origin: Sweden

Service history
- In service: 1935–1940
- Used by: Sweden

Production history
- Designer: AB Landsverk
- Designed: 1930–1931
- Manufacturer: AB Landsverk
- Produced: 1933
- No. built: 3

Specifications
- Mass: 11,000 kg (24,000 lb)
- Length: 5.20 m (17 ft 1 in)
- Width: 2.15 m (7 ft 1 in)
- Height: 2.22 m (7 ft 3 in)
- Crew: 4
- Armor: 8–24 mm (0.31 in – 0.94 in)
- Main armament: 1 × Bofors 37 mm AT-gun L/45 (37 mm kan fm/32)
- Secondary armament: 2 × Browning M1917 (6.5 mm ksp m/14-29)
- Engine: Maybach DSO 8; 150 hp (110 kW)
- Operational range: 150 kilometres (93 mi)
- Maximum speed: 40 km/h (25 mph)

Landsverk L-10 (Swedish Army designation: stridsvagn m/31, abbr. strv m/31, "tank model-1931") was a Swedish late interwar era medium tank constructed by AB Landsverk for the Swedish Army between 1930 and 1933.

The tank had an advanced design for its time, being the first tank produced to feature an all-welded construction and using periscopes for visibility rather than view slits. It was armed with a turret mounted Bofors 37 mm anti-tank gun L/45 (37 mm kanon fm/32) and two Browning M1917 machine guns (6.5 mm kulspruta m/14-29), one coaxial mounted in the turret and one flexible mounted in the hull, and was equipped with 8–24 mm (0.31 in – 0.94 in) of armour.

== History ==
Development of the L-10 started in 1930 as part of a competition set up by the Royal Swedish Army Materiel Administration (KAF) for the next generation of Swedish tanks. Landsverk competed against designs from AB Bofors (Krupp) and Morgårdshammar AB, evaluation being conducted in the fall the same year. Landsverk's designs came out on top and Landsverk was selected as contractor in January 1931. After further in-depth evaluation of Landsverk's designs, KAF ordered three L-10 test vehicles from Landsverk in October 1931, along one Landsverk L-30 trial vehicle (essentially an L-10 with deployable wheels).

The three L-10 vehicles were built in 1933 and delivered to the Swedish Army in 1935. Armour was delivered by Bofors. Despite being highly advanced for their time, they often broke down when not handled properly, and lessons learned from their trials were incorporated into the much improved Landsverk L-60 (strv m/38). When World War II broke out, they were dug in as static bunkers due to a lack of spare parts, as many key parts were produced abroad.

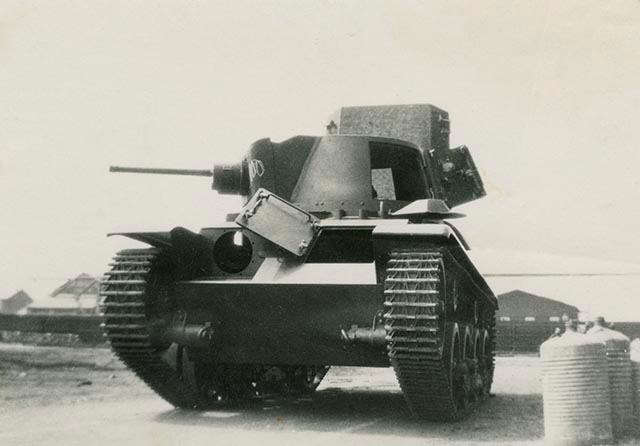
Unfinished L-10 at Landsverk Landskrona, 1933–1935.

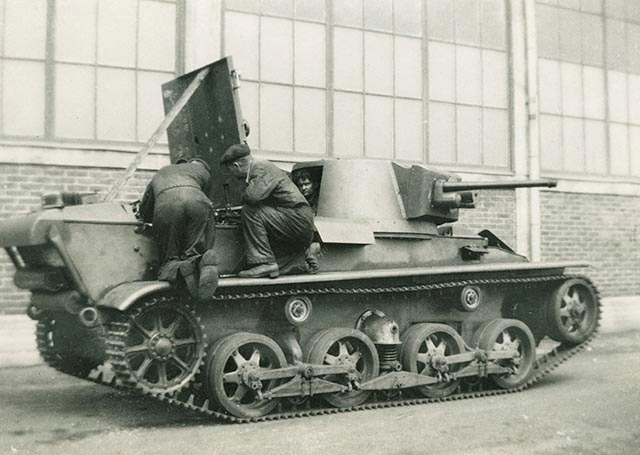
Unfinished L-10 at Landsverk Landskrona, 1933–1935.

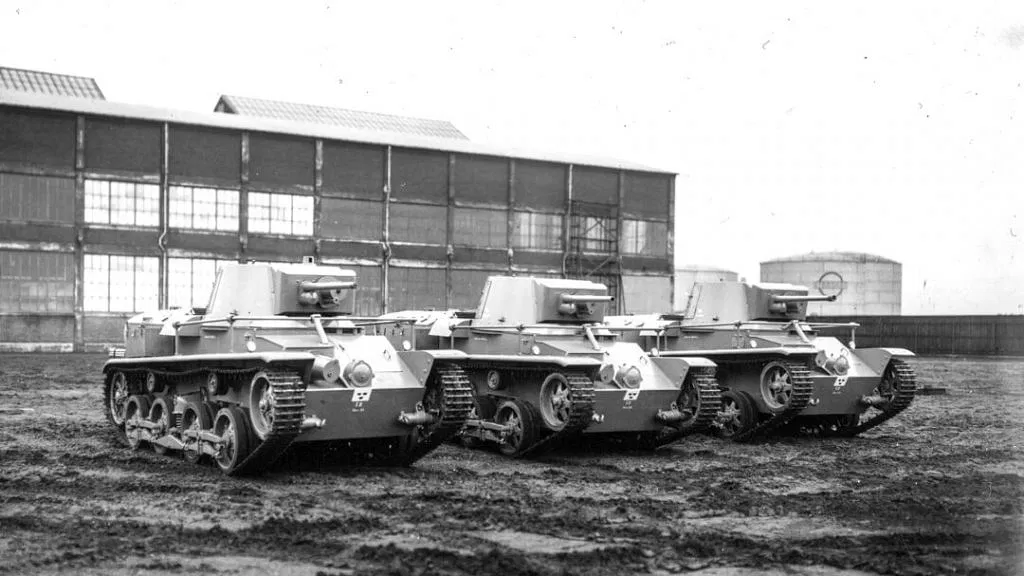
The three Landsverk L-10 (strv m/31) delivered to the Swedish Army.

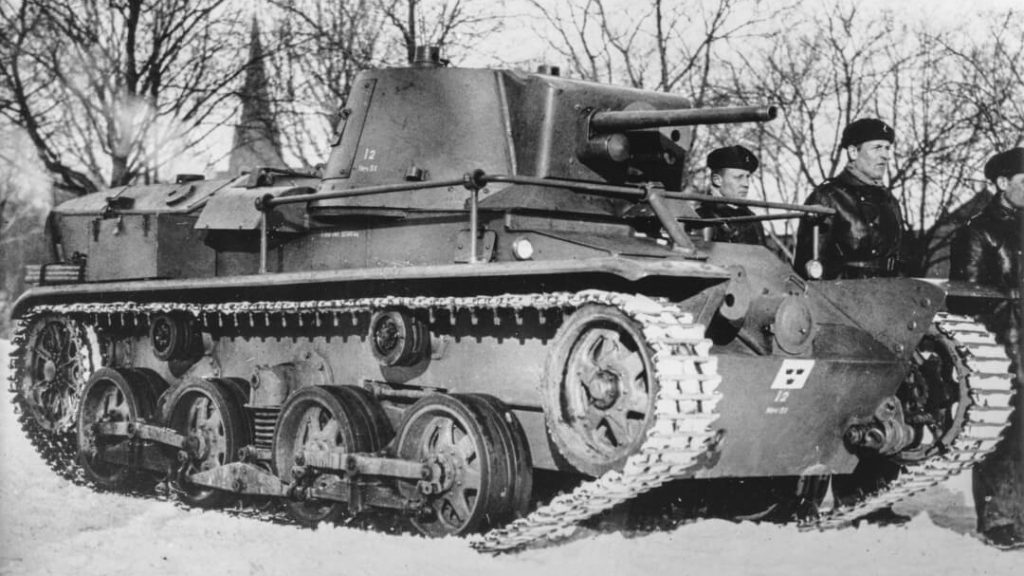
Stridsvagn m/31 during winter trials, late 1930s.

== Landsverk L-30 (strv fm/31) ==
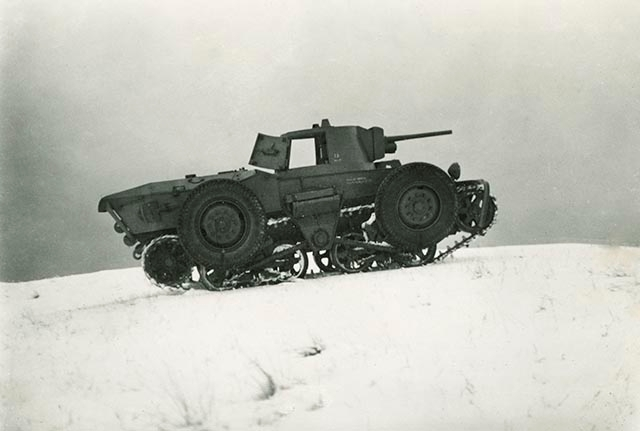
Landsverk L-30 on tracks during trials at Landskrona in 1935

The L-10 had a variant, known as the L-30, which featured deployable wheel propulsion in addition to its tracks, the idea being that wheeled and tracked propulsion could be quickly interchanged (in less than a minute, even while on the move) depending on the travel surface (road/terrain). A mild steel prototype with a wooden mockup turret was ordered in 1931 (designated stridsvagn fm/31: fm = försöksmodell, "trial model") along the three L-10 (strv m/31) and delivered to the Swedish Army for trials in 1935.

== Surviving vehicles ==
One L-10 (strv m/31) has been preserved. The vehicle was exhibited at the Swedish Armour Museum in Axvall between 1969 and 2007, then was moved to the collection of the new Swedish Tank Museum Arsenalen, where it has remained.

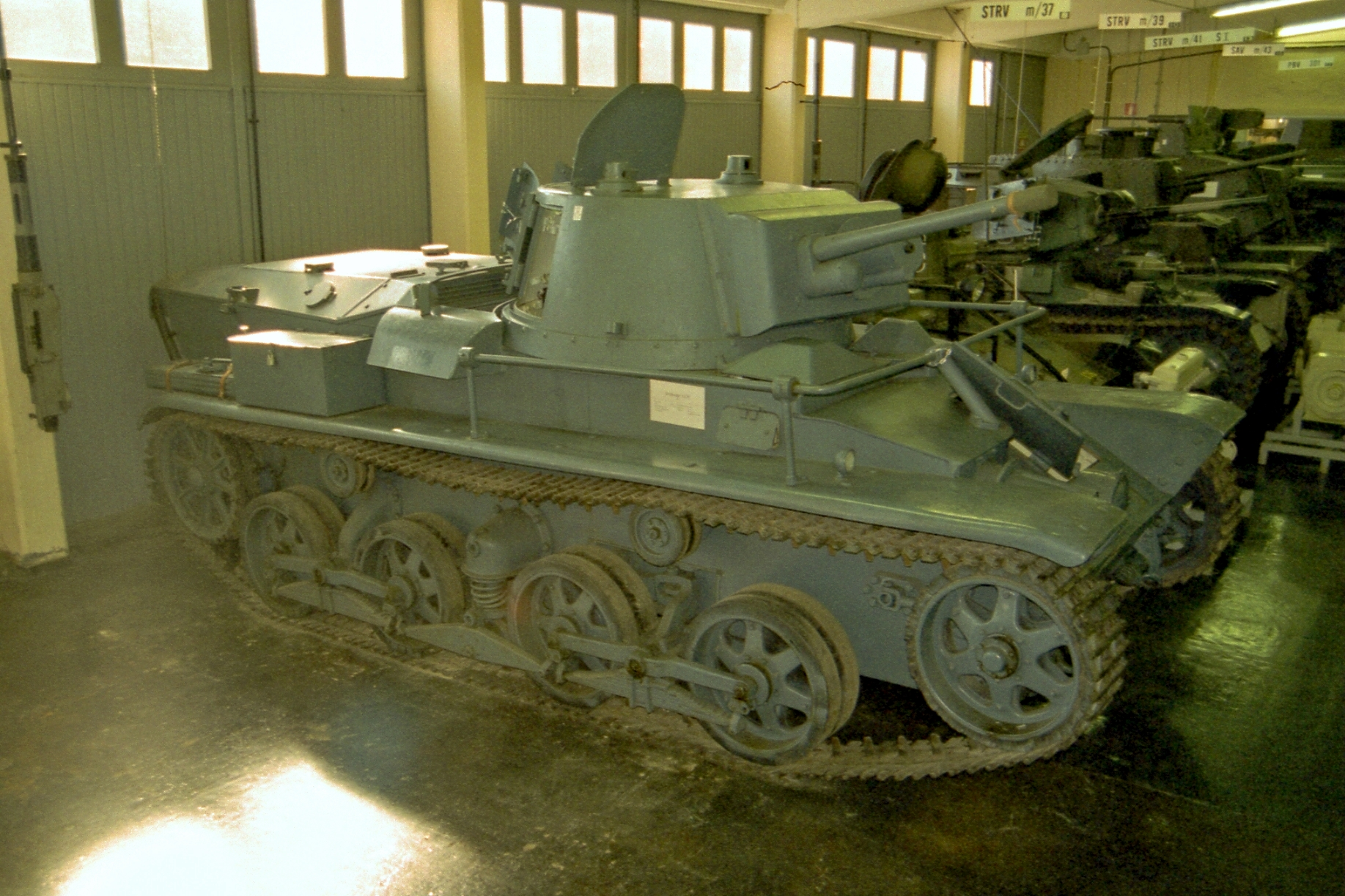
The surviving L-10 (strv m/31) displayed at the Swedish Armour Museum in Axvall, 2003.

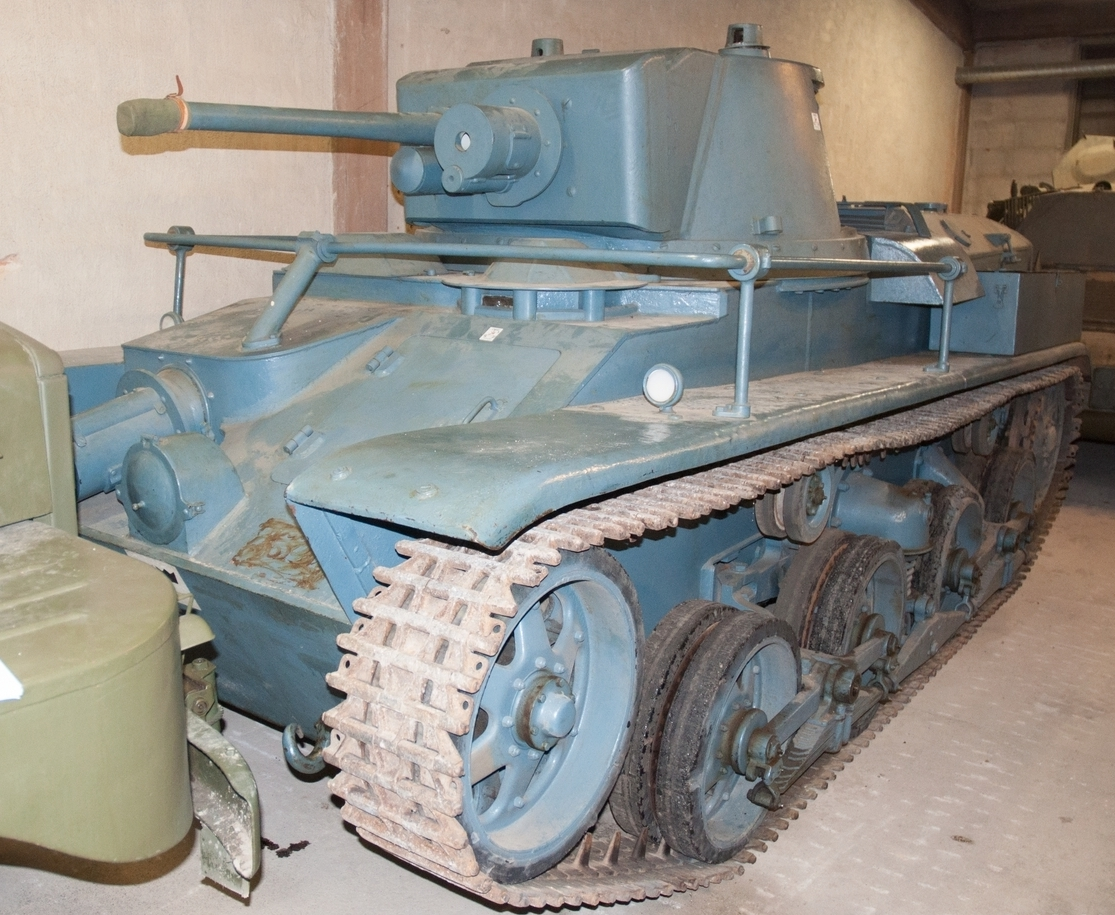
The surviving L-10 (strv m/31) in Swedish Tank Museum Arsenalens storage unit.

== Period Landsverk armoured vehicles ==
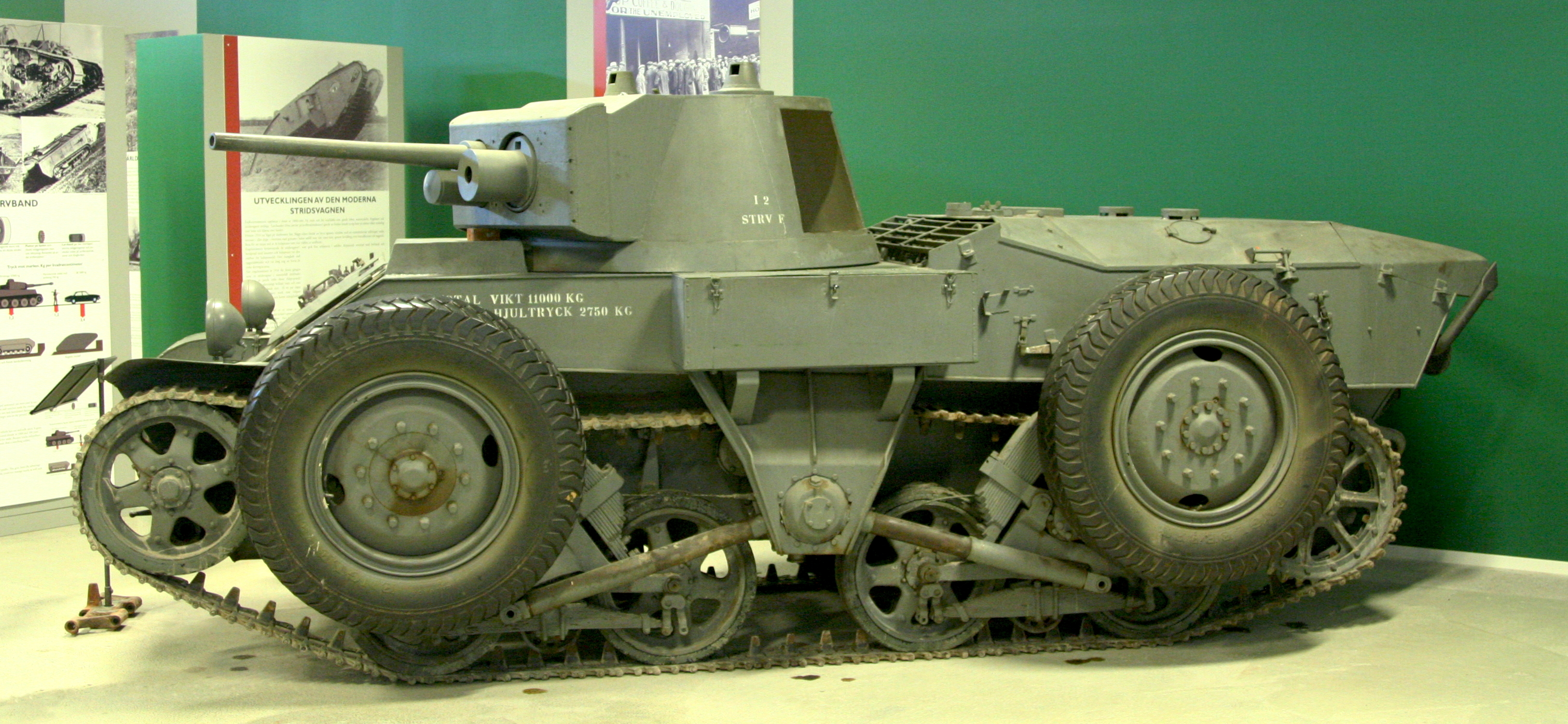
Landsverk L-30, an L-10 outfitted with wheel-cum-track suspension.

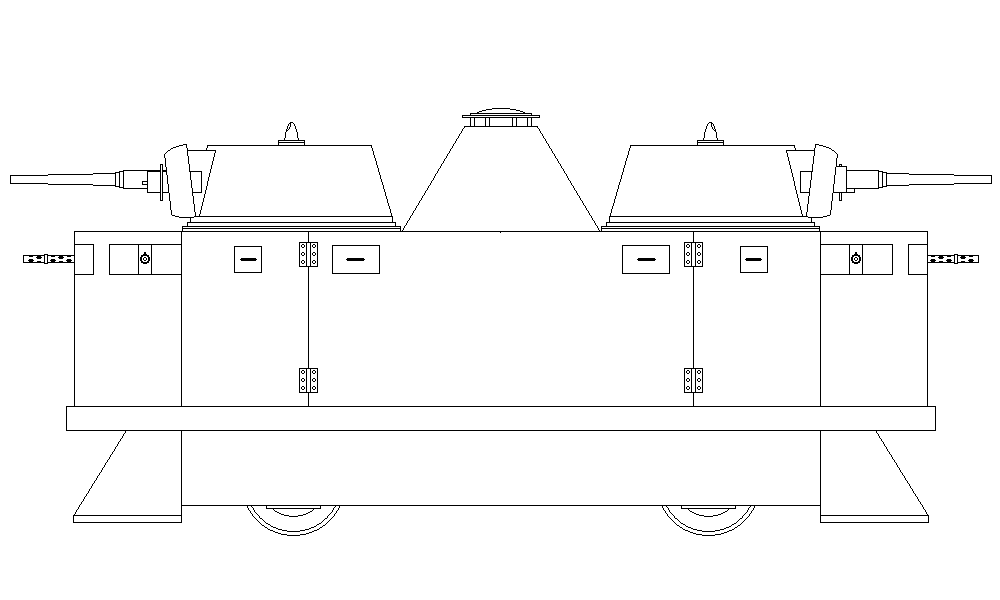
Landsverk L-321 armoured draisine, featuring two L-10 turrets.

Example list (incomplete)

Tracked vehicles

- Landsverk L-5
- Landsverk L-10
- Landsverk L-30
- Landsverk L-60
- Landsverk L-62
- Landsverk L-100
- Landsverk L-101
- Landsverk L-120
- Landsverk Lago

Wheeled vehicles

- Landsverk L-170
- Landsverk L-180
- Landsverk L-181
- Landsverk L-182
- Landsverk L-185
- Landsverk L-210
- Landsverk Lynx

Railroad vehicles

- Landsverk L-310
- Landsverk L-320
- Landsverk L-321
