= List of World War II weapons =

World War II saw rapid technological innovation in response to the needs of the various combatants. Many different weapons systems evolved as a result.

This list does not consist of all weapons used by all countries in World War II.

== By country ==
- List of World War II weapons of Australia
- List of World War II weapons of Canada
- List of World War II weapons of China
- List of World War II weapons of Denmark
- List of World War II weapons of Finland
- List of World War II weapons of France
- List of World War II weapons of Germany
- List of World War II weapons of Greece
- List of World War II weapons of Hungary
- List of World War II weapons used in Ireland
- List of World War II weapons of Italy
- List of World War II weapons of Japan
- List of World War II weapons of Norway
- List of World War II weapons of Portugal
- List of World War II weapons of Romania
- List of World War II weapons of Slovak Army
- List of World War II weapons of Switzerland
- List of World War II weapons of the Soviet Union
- List of World War II weapons of Thailand
- List of World War II weapons of Turkey
- List of World War II weapons of the United Kingdom
- List of World War II weapons of the United States
- List of World War II weapons of Yugoslavia

== See also ==
- Captured US firearms in Axis use in World War II
- Lists of World War II military equipment
- German designations of foreign artillery in World War II
- German designations of foreign firearms in World War II
