= List of World War II weapons of Denmark =

This is a list of the weapons of Denmark during World War II. This list will be for the Danish military as they were at the German invasion of Denmark (1940).

== Small arms ==
=== Side arms ===
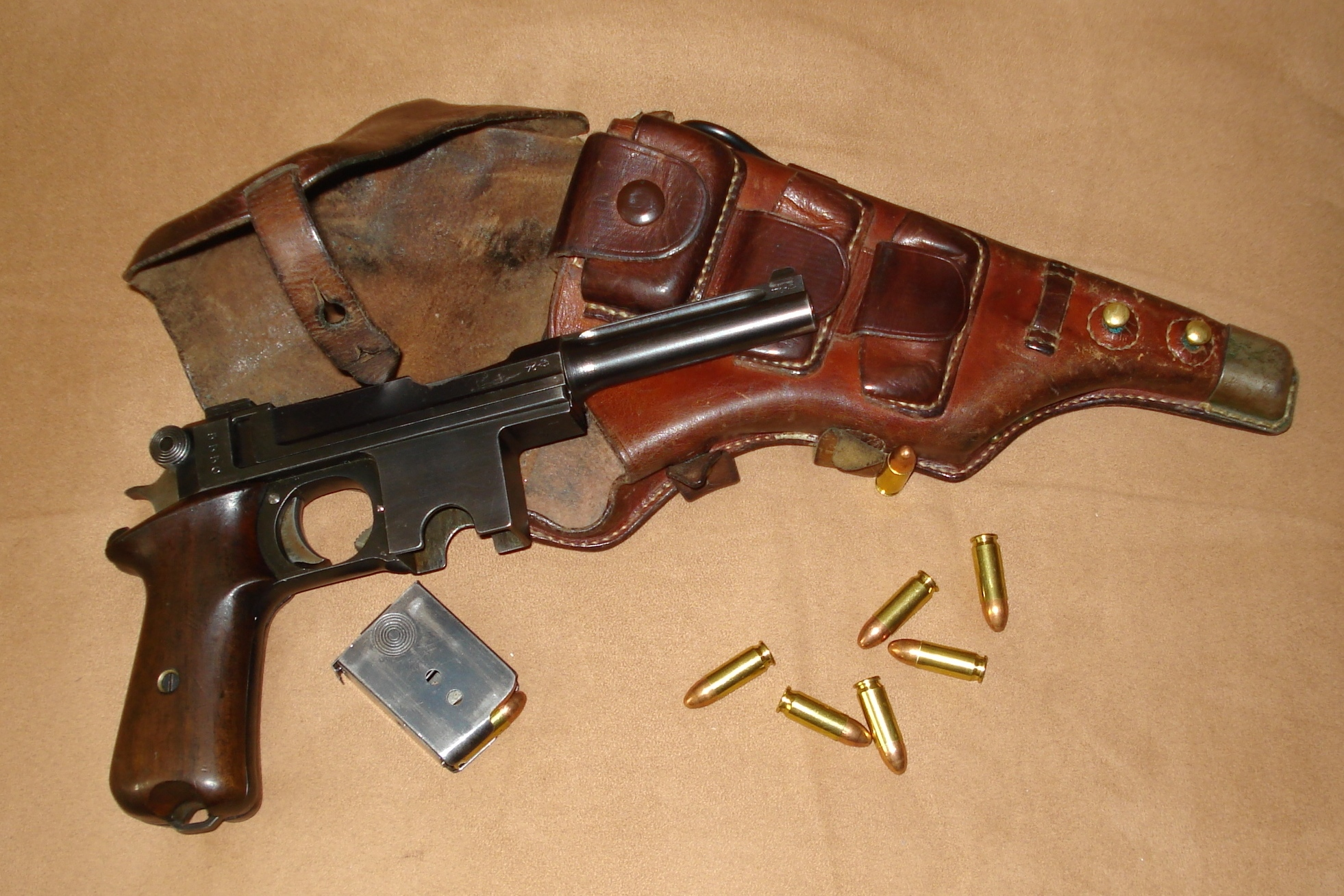
Danish M1910/21 Bergmann–Bayard pistol. Standard infantry sidearm of Danish military in World War II. Non-combat units such as artillery received 19th century Danish revolvers.

- Bergmann–Bayard M1910/21 pistol
- Danish 1865/97 revolver
- Danish M1880/85 Army revolver
- Mauser C96
- FN Model 1910
- FN Model 1922
- Walther PP/K
- Smith & Wesson Model 10
- Browning Hi-Power
- Welrod

=== Rifles ===
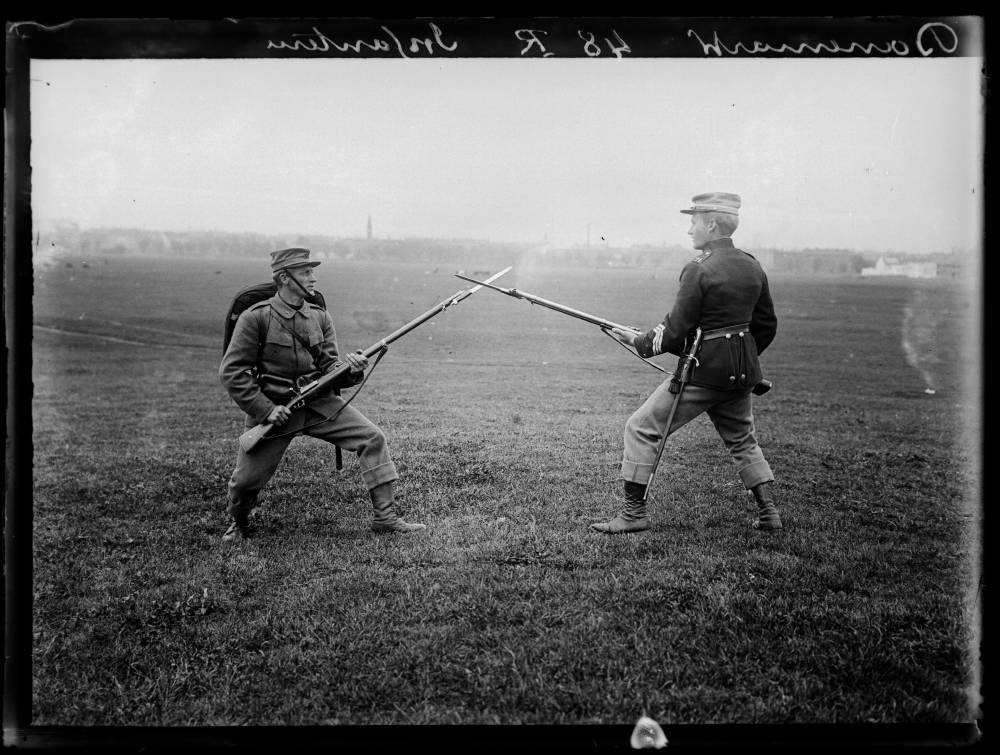
Two Danish infantryman with Danish Gevær M/89 Krag–Jørgensen rifles. The Danish variants of the Krag–Jørgensen were their main service rifle in WWII.

- Danish 1889 Krag–Jørgensen(Denmark Krag–Jørgensen verson)
- Swedish Mauser M96
- Automatgevar M42
- Mauser Karabiner 98k
- Lee-Enfield
- M1917 Enfield
- M1 Garand
- M1 carbine

=== SMG ===
- Sten Mk2 (Danish resistance some local copy)
- Husqvarna m/37 ( Verson Sweden of Finland Suomi KP/-31, some is modified)
- Lettet-Forsogs
- MP38 (Danish resistance)
- MP-32 ( derived from Mp 35)

=== Machine guns ===
- Madsen machine gun
- Browning M1919

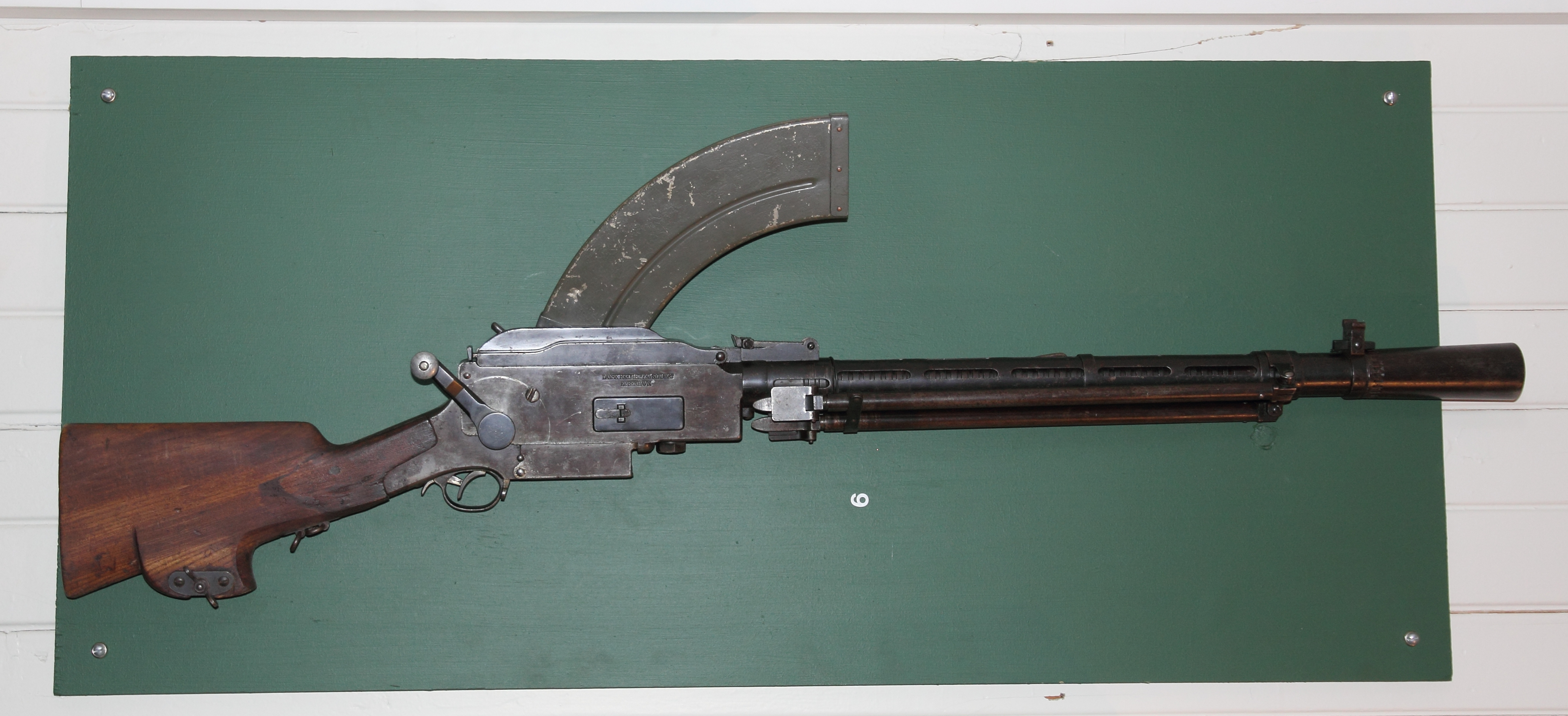
Madsen light machine gun which is Danish designed and saw use with the Danish army in many different improved variants made over time from 1902 till just after World War II.

== Artillery ==
=== Field Artillery ===
- Krupp 7.5 cm Model 1903
- Canon de 105 modèle 1930 Schneider

=== Heavy Artillery ===
- Schneider 149 mm Obusier Modele 1929

=== Anti-tank guns ===
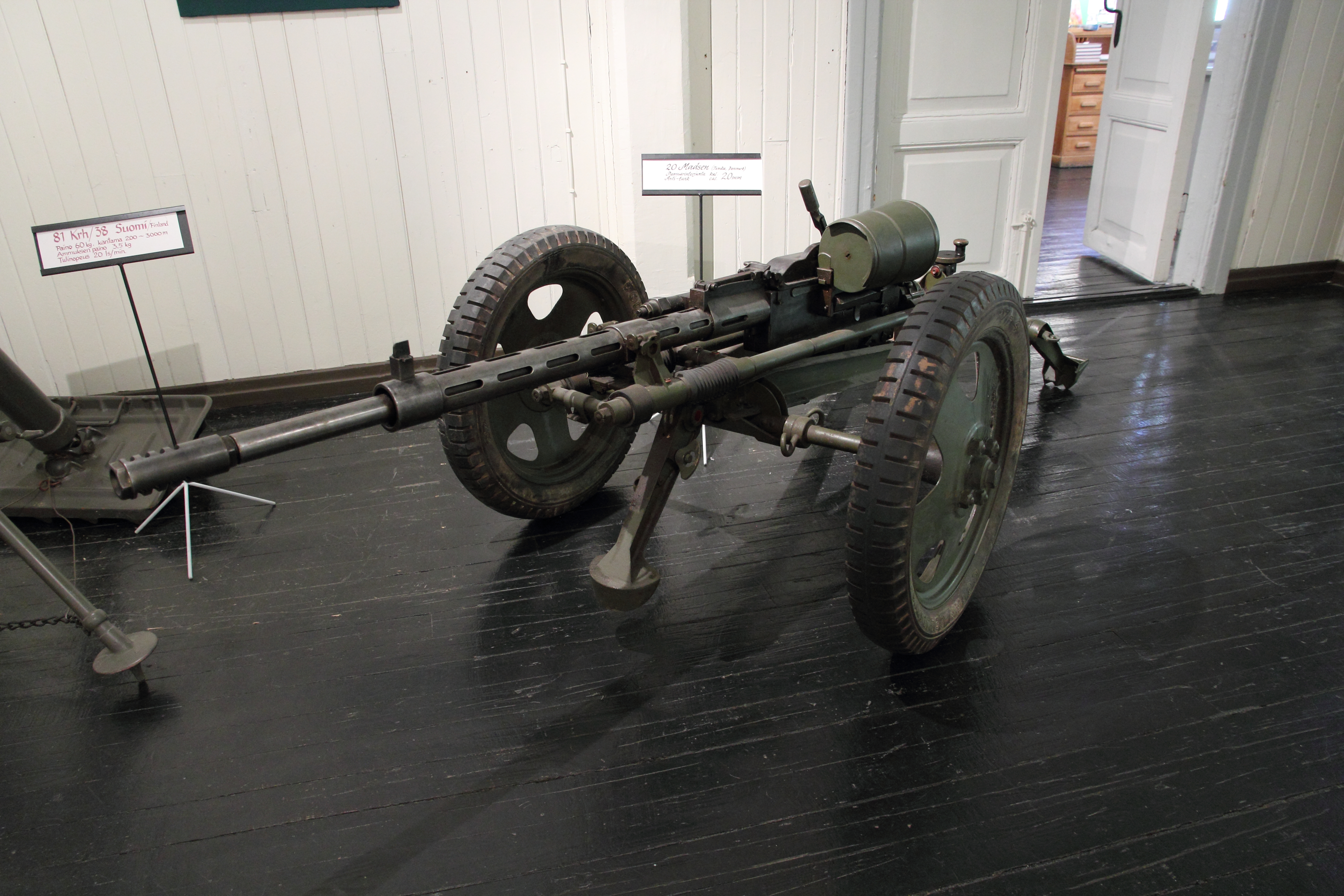
Madsen 20mm autocannon on anti-tank carriage. The Danish autocannon was used by the Danes as an anti-tank gun during the German invasion of Denmark.

- Madsen 20 mm cannon
- Bofors 37 mm anti-tank gun

== Armoured fighting vehicles ==
=== Tankettes ===
Vickers-Carden-Loyd Light Patrol Car

=== Armoured cars ===
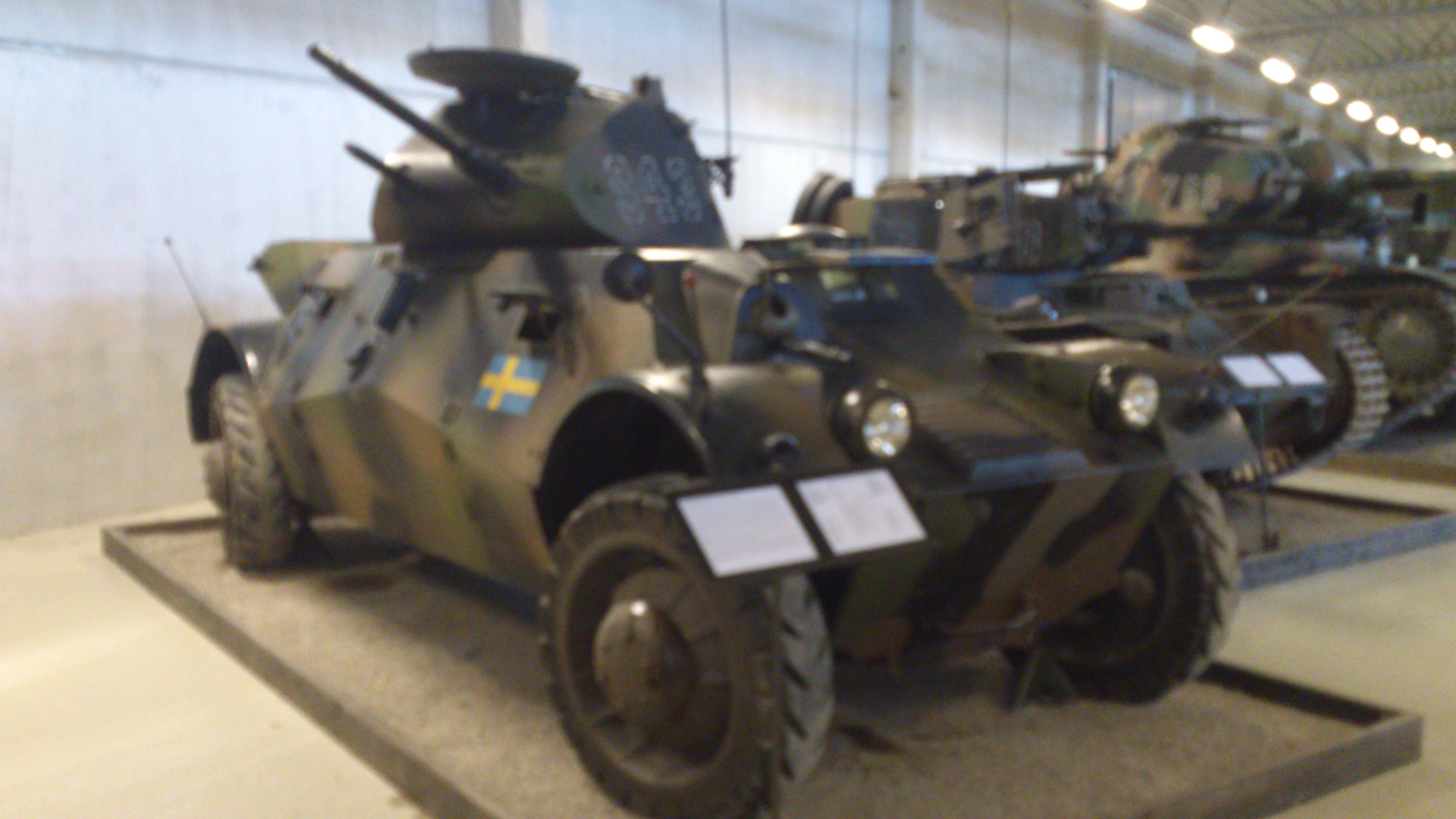
Pansarbil M/39 which was the most numerous AFV in service with Denmark during the German invasion

- L180
- Landsverk L-185(1 for training)
- Pansarbil m/39

=== Motorcycles ===
- Nimbus MC w/20 mm MG
