= List of World War II weapons of Slovak Army =

This is a list of the weapons of Slovakia during World War II, which does not include weapons used by partisans.

== Small arms ==
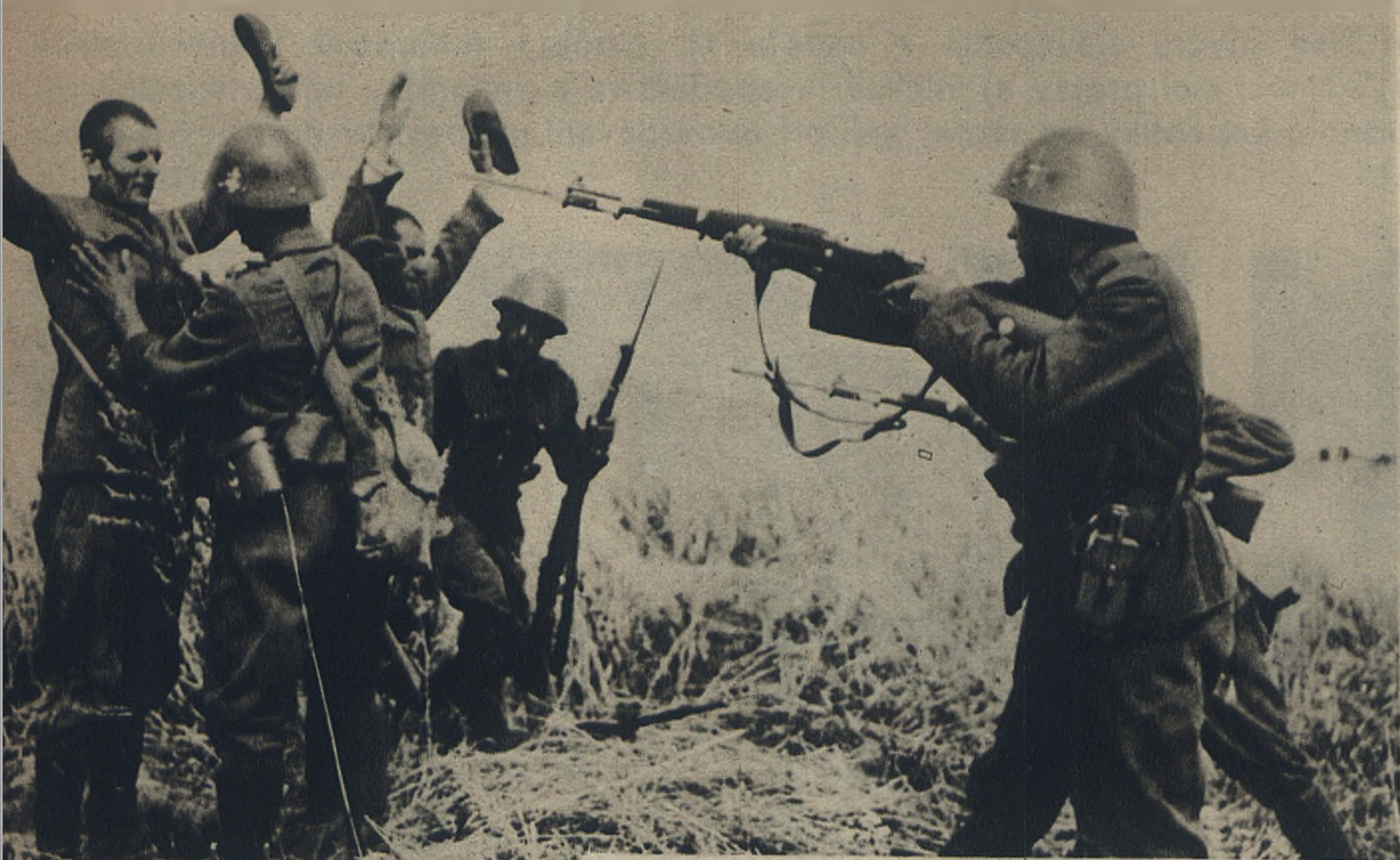
Slovak soldiers force Red Army soldiers to surrender

=== Small arms ===
- Vz. 22 pistol
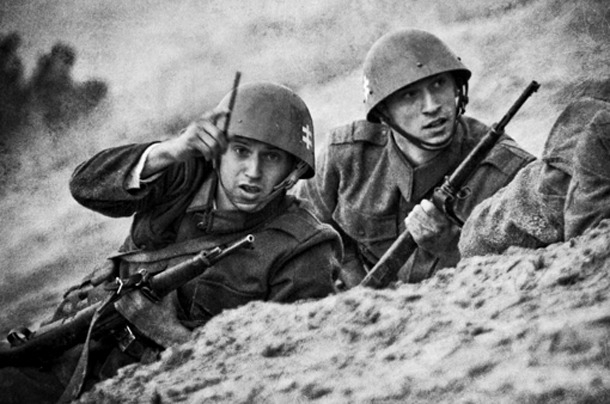
  Slovak soldiers during the campaign against the Soviet Union
- Pistole vz. 24
- Roth–Steyr M1907
- P08

=== Rifles ===
- Vz. 24-Standard issue
- Karabiner 98k

=== Submachine guns ===
- MP 18- Used by Reinsurance division in Belorussia and Ukraine against pro-Soviet partisans
- MP 40
- PPD-40-Captured from Red Army
- ZK-383

=== Machine guns ===
- ZB vz. 26
- ZB vz. 30
- ZB-53
- Schwarzlose M1907/12
- MG 34

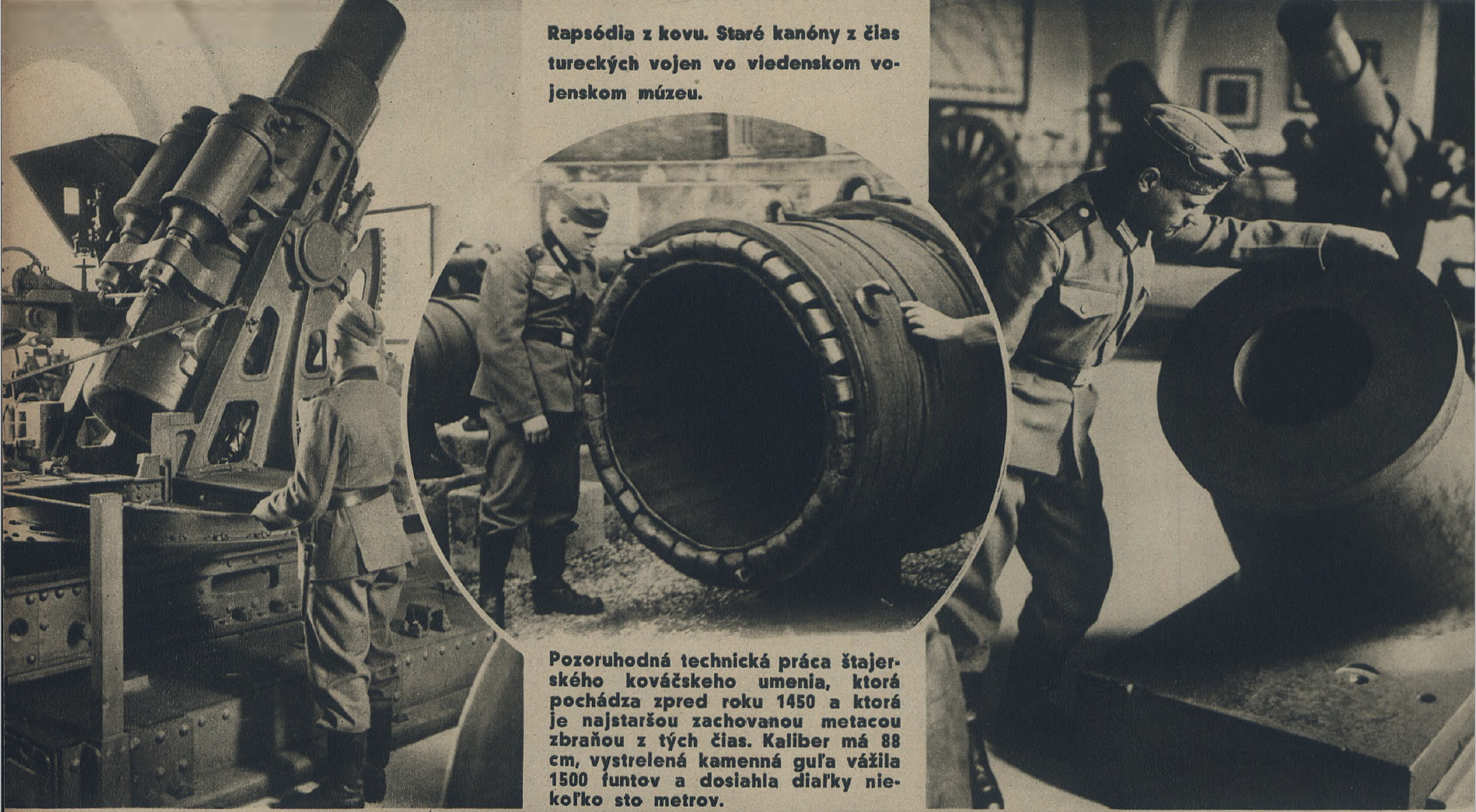
Slovak artillery poster in Museum of Military History in Vienna.

== Artillery ==
=== Mortars ===
- 8 cm minomet vz. 36

=== Field/medium artillery ===
- 10 cm houfnice vz. 30
- 10.5 cm hruby kanon vz. 35

=== Heavy artillery ===
- 15 cm hrubá houfnice vz. 37
- Skoda 220 mm howitzer

=== Anti tank guns ===
- 3,7cm KPÚV vz. 34
- 3,7cm KPÚV vz. 37
- 4.7 cm KPÚV vz. 38

=== Anti aircraft guns ===
- 8.35 cm PL kanon vz. 22
- 9 cm kanon PL vz. 12/20
- 7.5 cm kanon PL vz. 37
- Škoda 76.5 mm L/50

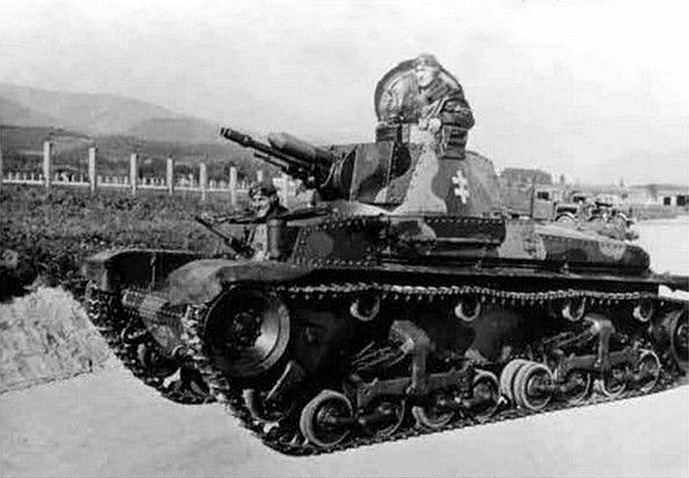
LT-35 in service of Slovak Army

== Armoured vehicles ==
=== Armoured cars ===
- OA vz. 27 - Used for training then scrapped in February 1943
- OA vz. 30

=== Tankettes ===
- Tančík vz. 33

=== Tanks ===
- LT-35 - Following the declaration of independence, the Slovak Army received additional units, which were used in operations on the Eastern Front.
- LT-38
- LT-40 - Based on the Czech LT vz. 38 chassis, the Slovak Army received 21 units in 1940.
- Marder III

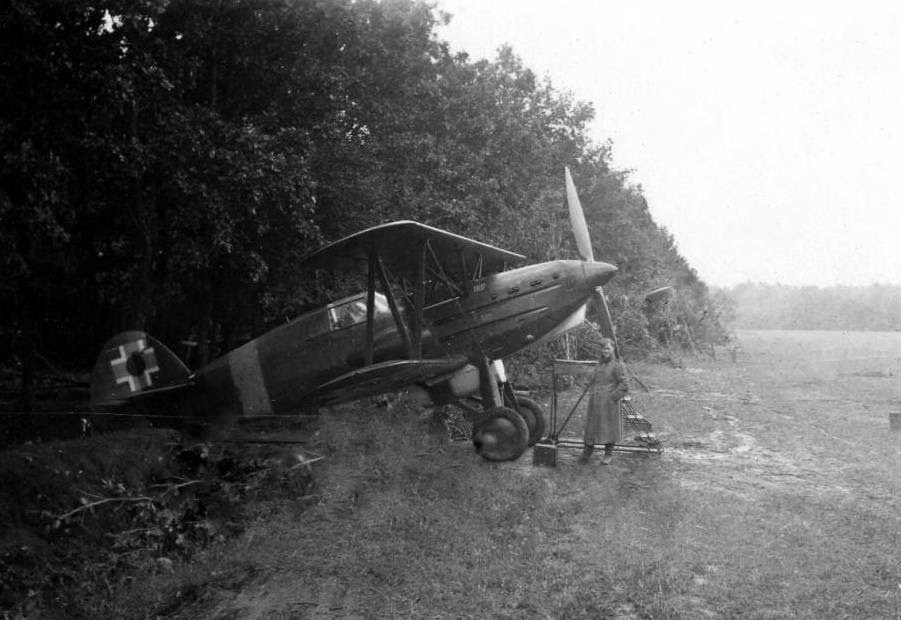
Avia B-534 of Slovak Air Force on Eastern Front

== See also ==
- List of World War II weapons of Denmark
- List of World War II weapons of Yugoslavia
- List of World War II weapons of Finland
- List of World War II military equipment of Poland
- List of Belgian military equipment of World War II
- List of Dutch military equipment of World War II
