= Swedish Tank Museum Arsenalen =

Swedish Tank Museum - Arsenalen (Försvarsfordonsmuseet Arsenalen)
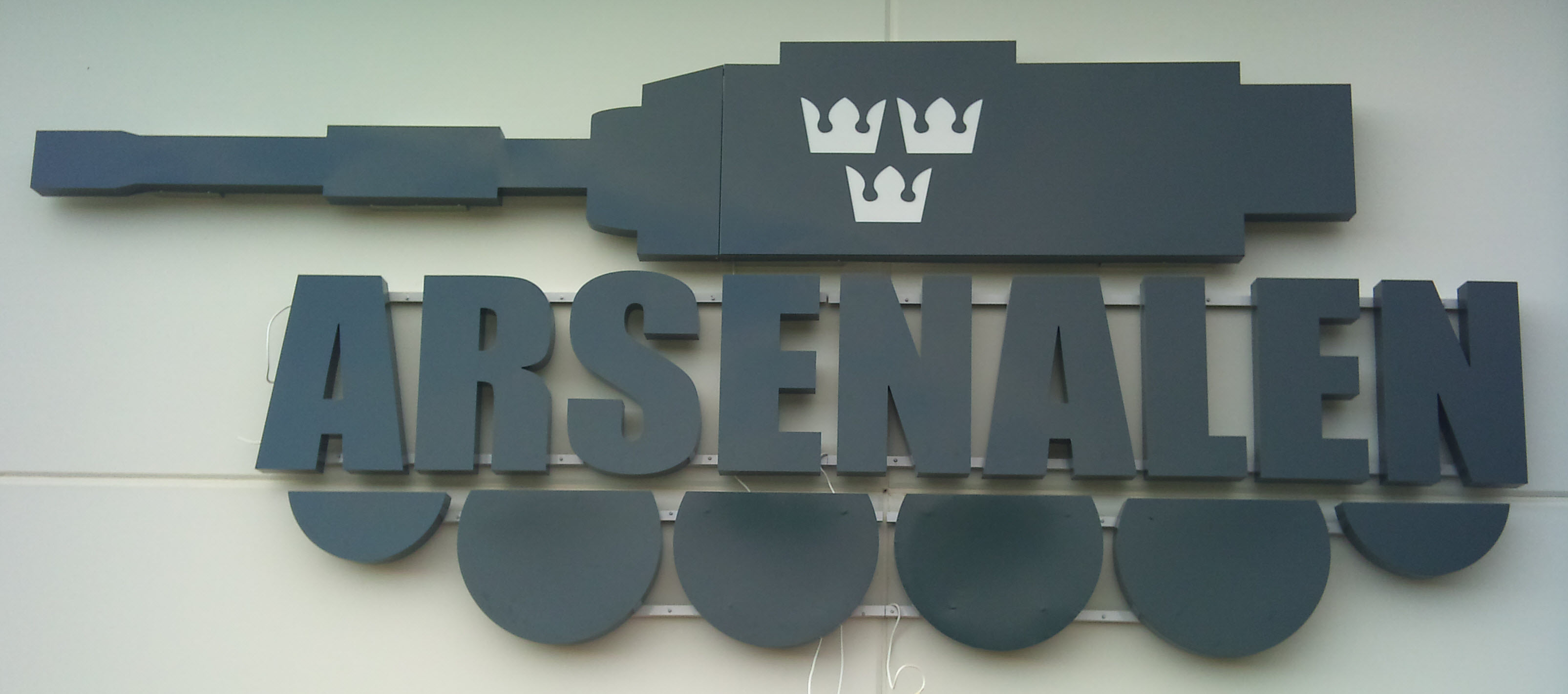

- Location of museum within Sweden
- Established: 2011
- Location: Strängnäs, Sweden
- Coordinates: 59.367340°N 16.9305°E
- Type: Military Museum
- Website: Arsenalen Museum

The Swedish Tank Museum Arsenalen (Försvarsfordonsmuseet Arsenalen) is a museum specializing in armoured fighting vehicles that opened on 17 June 2011. It is located about 6 km from Strängnäs, Södermanland, Sweden. There are 75 vehicles on site in the museum and the museum owns 375 vehicles. The Museum is operated by a private, non-profit foundation.

== Exhibits ==
The Vehicle Hall is the main building containing vehicles, simulator, Figure Museum, and temporary exhibits.

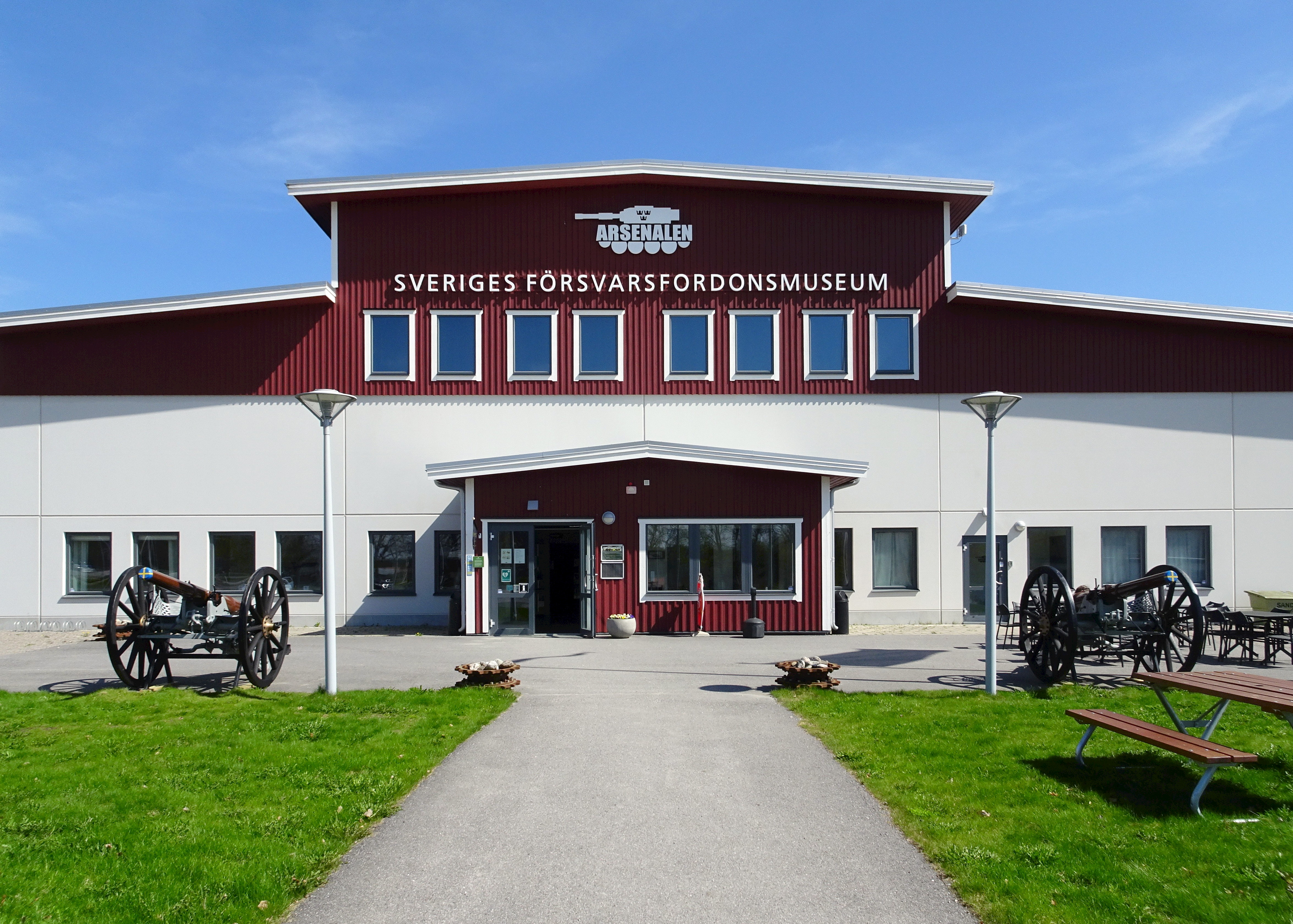
Main entrance to the Vehicle Hall

== Vehicles ==
Vehicles at the museum include:

- Stridsvagn m/21-29
- Renault NC-31
- T-37A
- Panzer I
- Stridsvagn fm/31
- Stridsvagn m/31
- Stridsvagn m/37
- Stridsvagn m/38
- Stridsvagn m/40L
- Stridsvagn m/41
- Stridsvagn m/42
- T-34
- Sherman Vc Firefly
- Centurion
- T-55
- Stridsvagn 74
- Stridsvagn 103
- T-72M1
- Infanterikanonvagn 91
- Stridsvagn 104
- Leopard 2K
- Stormartillerivagn m/43
- Infanterikanonvagn 103
- Bandkanon 1
- StuG III
- Marder II
- Jagdpanzer 38(t) "Hetzer"
- Pansarvärnskanonvagn m/43
- Pansarbil fm/29
- Pansarbil m/31
- Pansarbil m/39
- M8 Greyhound
- Terrängbil m/42 (KP-bil)
- Ferret armoured car
- Humvee
- Luftvärnskanonvagn fm/43
- Luftvärnsrobotbandvagn 701
- Universal Carrier
- M113
- Pansarbandvagn 301
- Pansarbandvagn 302
- Bandvagn 208
- Ford Model T
- Kübelwagen
- Willys MB
- Volvo TPV
- Volvo TP21
- Trabant
- Alvis Stalwart
- Pansarvärnspjästerrängbil 9031
