= Landsverk L-5 =

Swedish experimental light tank

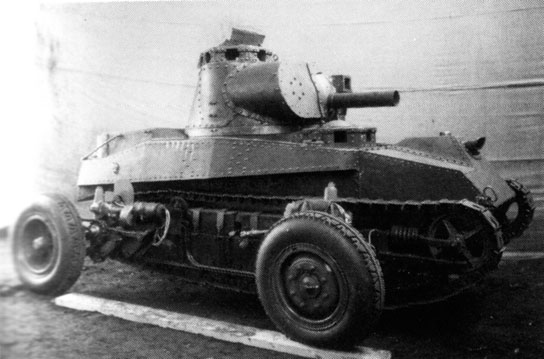
- Type: Light tank
- Place of origin: Sweden, Germany

Production history
- Designer: AB Landsverk
- Designed: 1928
- Manufacturer: Maschinenfabrik Esslingen
- Produced: 1929-1930
- No. built: 5-6

Specifications
- Mass: 7 t
- Length: 4.38 m
- Width: 2.4 m
- Height: 1.6 m
- Crew: 4
- Main armament: 37mm cannon
- Secondary armament: 2 x 7.92mm Dreyse light machine guns
- Engine: 4-cylinder petrol Benz-50-PS, 70-PS-NAG-D7P; 52hp-77hp
- Suspension: semi-elliptic leaf spring
- Fuel capacity: 70-85 l
- Operational range: 180 km
- Maximum speed: 23 km/h (tracks), 46 km/h (wheels)

Landsverk L-5 was one of the first tanks designed by the Swedish industrial company Landsverk. It was first produced in 1929 as a series of experimental wheeled-and-tracked vehicles utilizing the wheel-cum-track system. It never entered service and the prototype remained uncompleted.

The concept was revived in the Landsverk L-30 design a few years later.

== See also ==
- Landsverk L-30
