= Canon de 105 modèle 1930 Schneider =

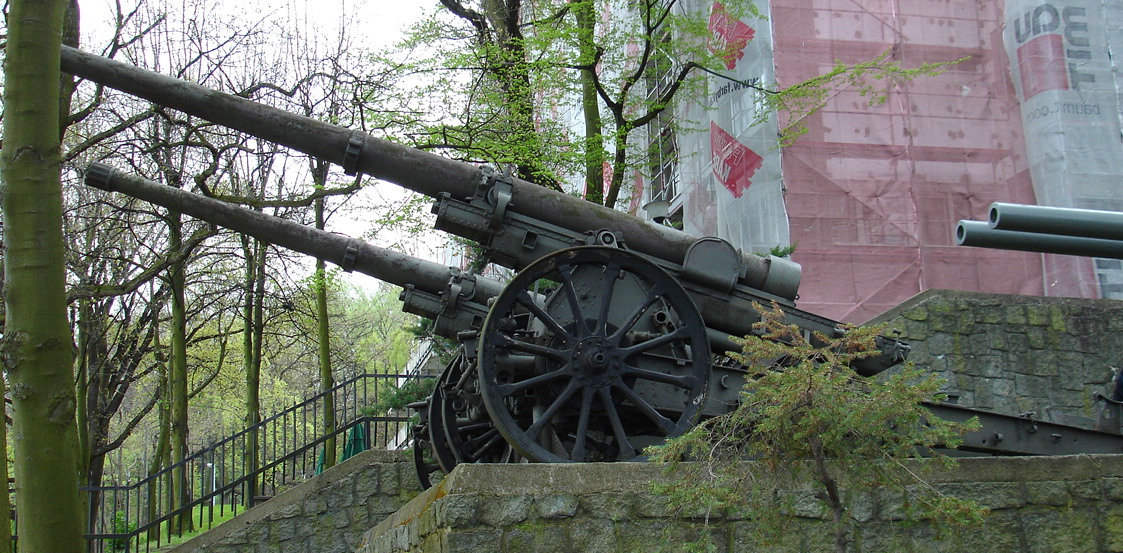
- A Polish coastal version in Gdynia
- Type: Field gun
- Place of origin: France

Service history
- In service: 1930–1945
- Used by: Denmark; Greece
- Wars: World War II

Production history
- Designer: Schneider
- Manufacturer: Schneider
- No. built: Denmark: 12; Greece: 11

Specifications
- Mass: 5,120 kilograms (11,290 lb)
- Barrel length: 5.05 m (16 ft 7 in) L/48
- Shell: Separate loading 105x390R
- Shell weight: 16.3 kilograms (35 lb 15 oz)
- Caliber: 105 mm (4.13 in)
- Breech: Interrupted screw
- Recoil: Hydro-pneumatic
- Carriage: split-trail
- Elevation: -0° to +43°
- Traverse: 47°
- Rate of fire: up to 6 rounds per minute
- Muzzle velocity: 850 m/s (2,789 ft/s)
- Maximum firing range: 20,150 metres (22,040 yd)

The Canon de 105 modèle 1930 Schneider (Danish: 10½ cm, 48 kaliber lang, feltkanon m/30) was a field gun used by the armies of Greece, Denmark, and Poland during World War II. It used the same sprung single-axle split-trail carriage as the Schneider 149 mm Modele 1929 howitzer. The gun had steel wheels with solid rubber tires and could be towed by either a horse-team or artillery tractor. It used the cumbersome Schneider-trademark spade plates that had to be hammered into the ground to anchor the gun in place.

The German Army designated these guns 10.5 cm Kanone 310(g) and 10.5 cm Kanone 321(d) respectively, but it is unknown if they actually used them themselves.
