= Schneider 149 mm Obusier Modele 1929 =

- Type: Howitzer
- Place of origin: France

Service history
- In service: 1929–1945
- Used by: Denmark; Nazi Germany
- Wars: World War II

Production history
- Designer: Schneider et Cie
- Designed: 1927
- Manufacturer: Prototypes: Schneider et Cie; Production: Hærens Geværfabrik
- Produced: 1929-1931
- No. built: 24
- Variants: 155 mm conversion

Specifications
- Mass: Travel: 5,675 kg (12,511 lb); Combat: 5,165 kg (11,387 lb)
- Barrel length: 3.28 m (10 ft 9 in) 22 caliber
- Shell: Separate loading charge and projectile
- Shell weight: 38.4 kg (85 lb)
- Caliber: 149 mm (5.9 in)
- Breech: Interrupted screw
- Recoil: Hydro-pneumatic
- Carriage: Sprung single-axle split-trail
- Elevation: 0° to +45°
- Traverse: 40°
- Rate of fire: 4 rpm
- Muzzle velocity: 635 m/s (2,080 ft/s)
- Maximum firing range: 15 km (9.3 mi)

The Schneider 149 mm Obusier Modele 1929 or M.29 L/22 S was a Danish howitzer designed by the French Schneider company and produce in Denmark after the First World War. A number were still on hand during the Second World War and served in Danish and German service.

== History ==
As a result of the defeat of the central-powers during the First World War and the subsequent Treaty of Versailles, Germany was forbidden from developing and selling arms. This meant that traditional clients who had previously purchased armaments from Krupp and Rheinmetall had to find new suppliers. Under these circumstances Denmark placed an order in 1927 with Schneider to produce a howitzer to equip the Danish Army and the 149 mm (5.9 in) caliber was chosen so they could use existing stocks of ammunition. 149 mm was an odd caliber since French produced artillery tended to be 152–155 mm (6.0–6.1 in) caliber and 149 mm was more common in German, Austro-Hungarian, Czech or Italian artillery. Denmark ordered four guns from Schneider and a license to produce another twenty guns at the Hærens Geværfabrik government arsenal in Copenhagen. The last guns being delivered in 1931.

In Danish service the gun was known as the M.29 L/22 S and it used the same sprung single-axle split-trail carriage as the Canon de 105 modèle 1930 field gun. The gun had steel wheels with solid rubber tires and could be towed by either a horse-team or artillery tractor. It used the same Schneider spade plates as earlier guns that had to be hammered into the ground to anchor the gun in place. Some of 149 mm guns may have later been re-bored to use 155 mm ammunition. The Germans assigned the designations 15 cm sFH 461(d) to the 149 mm guns and 15.5 cm sFH 469(d) to the 155 mm guns. Surviving guns are believed to have been assigned to German occupation units during the Second World War.
