= List of World War II weapons of Yugoslavia =

This is a list of World War II weapons of Yugoslavia, more specifically land weapons used by the Royal Yugoslav Army during the Axis invasion of Yugoslavia. Weapons used by the resistance groups the Yugoslav Partisans and Chetniks will not be included due to their scavenged and random nature. However, if you want to place a list put a title above it saying it is for resistance forces.

== Small arms ==
=== Sidearms ===
- FN M1910/22
- Ruby 1915
- M1895 Nagant Revolver
- Beretta M1934
- Serbian Nagant 1891 ( reserve. Copy from Swedish M.1887)
- Rast & Gasser M1898 (reserve)
- Gasser 1873 (reserve)
- ČZ vz. 38
- Roth Steyr 1907 (reserve)
- Steyr 1912
- Luger
- Tokarev TT-33 (Soviet aid)
- Walther P38

=== Rifles ===
- Yugo Mauser M1924 Rifle(standard-issue rifle, copy from Fn Model 1924)
- Carcano 1898
- M1 Carbine (American aid)
- Kbk wz. 1929
- vz. 24
- Gewehr 41 (captured)
- Gewehr 43 (captured)
- Mosin-Nagant
- Mannlicher 1895 /24 (converted to FN Yugo Mauser 1924 standard)
- Mauser-Koka (copy from mauser M1871)
- Serbian Mauser 1899 (many cut down to carbine length copy from Mauser Model 1895)
- Lebel 1886/93 (supplied from France during WW1)
- Berthier rifle (WW1)
- Kar 98k
- Sturmgewehr 44 (captured)
- Lee Enfield

=== SMG ===
- Sten MK2 (Used by the Yugoslav Partisans and Chetniks. Some local copy used in the war)
- ZK-383
- MP38/40/41 (Captured from German and some local copy used in the war)
- PPSh 41
- PPS-43 (Soviet aid)
- PPD-40 (Soviet aid)
- UD M42
- Thompson
- Erma EMP-35
- Beretta M1938 (captured)
- Danuvia 39M (captured)
- MP34
- MP35

=== Machine guns ===
- ZB vz. 26 (Bought 1500 light machine guns)
- ZB vz. 30J(Standard LMG. Produced under license and bought in 1936)
- Chauchat 1915/27
- Schwarzlose 1907/15 (chambered in 7.92)
- ZB vz 37
- ZB vz 53
- ZB vz 60
- MG 08
- DShK (Soviet aid)
- Breda M1930 (captured)
- Breda M1937 (captured)
- Maxim mg
- Hotchkiss 1914
- Bren
- MG34
- Reibel machine gun

=== Grenades, Explosives ===
- Vasić M12
- M1924 Stielhandgranate (captured)
- M1939 Eierhandgranate (captured)
- M35/38 hand grenade
- Improvised grenade

=== Mortars ===
- Yugoslav Brandt 27/31 (31/38)
- 8 cm Granatwerfer 34 (captured)
- 5 cm Granatwerfer 36 (captured)
- Granatnik wz 36
- Brixia Model 35 (captured)

=== Flamethrowers ===
- Abwehrflammenwerfer 42 (captured)
- Schilt portable flamethrower

=== Anti-tank weapon ===
- M1 Bazooka (American aid)
- Panzerfaust (captured)
- Panzerschreck (captured)
- Panzerbüchse 39 (captured)
- PIAT
- Boys anti-tank rifle

== Artillery ==
=== Field guns ===
- Canon de 105 mle 1913 Schneider
- Škoda 75 mm Model 1928

=== Heavy artillery ===
- Canon de 155 C modèle 1917 Schneider

=== Siege artillery ===
- Skoda 305 mm Model 1911

== Armoured fighting vehicles (AFVs) ==
=== Tanks ===
- Renault FT
- T-32 (Š-I-D)
- R-35

=== Armoured cars ===
- Peugeot armoured car
