= Landsverk L-100 =

Swedish tank prototype

Landsverk L-100 was a Swedish prototype tank in development during World War II. It had a crew of two, and its armament consisted of a 20 mm gun or one 6.5 mm machine gun. Top speed was around 55 km/h, and the vehicle weighed almost 5 tons. The Landsverk L-100 was never adopted by the Swedish Army.

Speed (max.)	Armor (max.)	Dimensions
55 km/h	9 mm	4.1 x 1.75 x 1.85 m
