= Landsverk L-62 Anti =

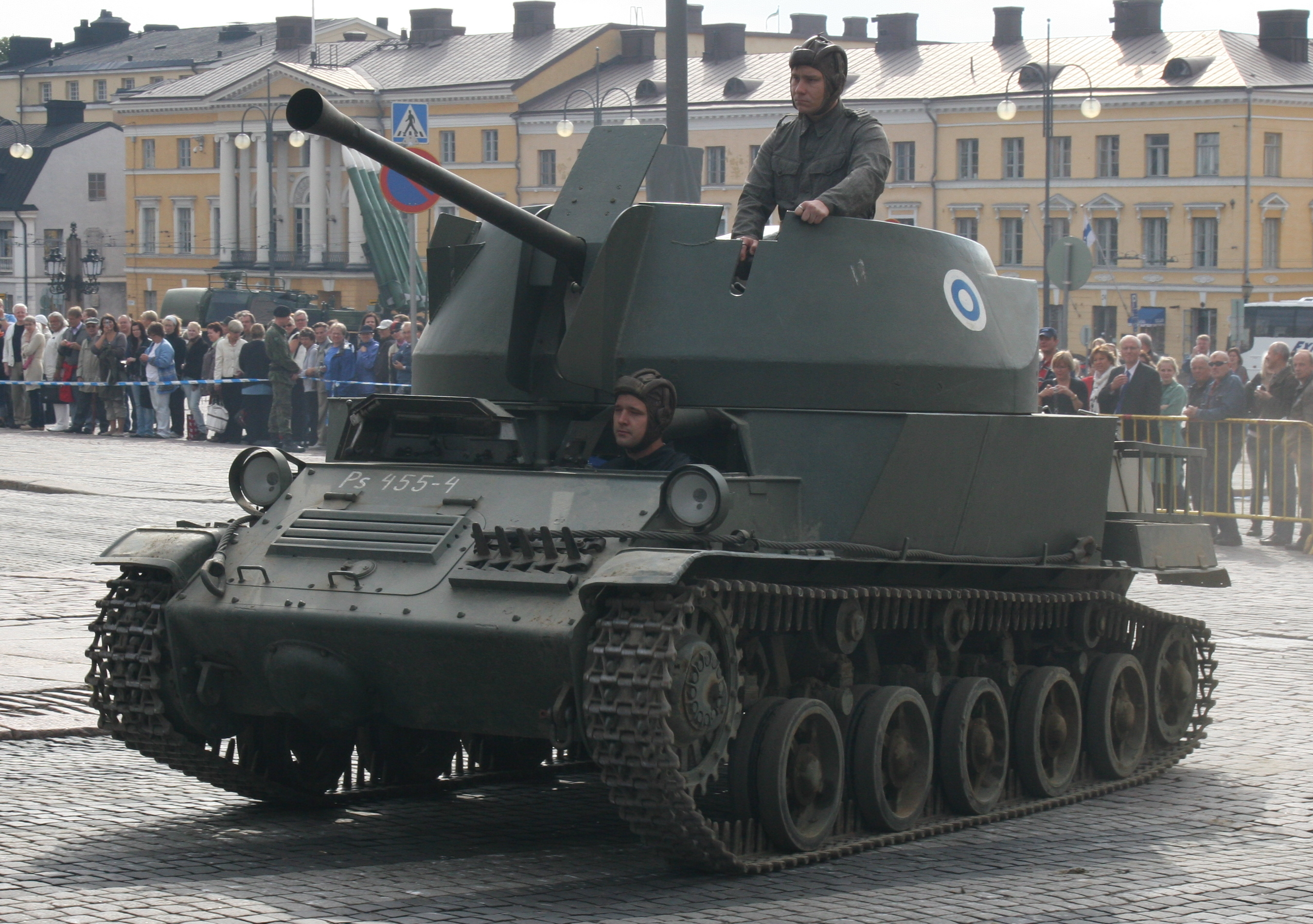
- Finnish Landsverk Anti II (10 ItPsv 40) on parade
- Type: Anti-aircraft tank (primary); Tank destroyer (secondary)
- Place of origin: Sweden

Service history
- In service: 1941–1945: 40M Nimród; 1942–1966: Anti II
- Used by: Hungary (Anti I, as 40M Nimród); Finland (Anti II)
- Wars: World War II; Continuation War

Production history
- Designer: AB Landsverk
- Designed: ~1933: Anti I ~1941: Anti II
- Manufacturer: AB Landsverk
- Produced: 1936
- No. built: Anti I: × 1 Anti II: × 6; 40M Nimród: × 135
- Variants: The Landsverk L-62 Anti II is a specific variant of the Landsverk Anti I.

Specifications
- Mass: 10,740 kg (23,680 lb)
- Length: 5.32 m (17 ft 5 in) (chassis)
- Width: 2.30 m (7 ft 7 in)
- Height: 2.30 m (7 ft 7 in)
- Crew: 5 (40M Nimród: 6): driver; gun layer (elevation) + gunner; gun trainer (rotation); commander; loader; extra loader (40M Nimród)
- Armor: 6–20 mm (0.24–0.79 in)
- Main armament: Bofors 40 mm Automatic Gun L/60; 4 × 160 cartridges
- Secondary armament: Sidearms of the crew
- Engine: L8V / 36 T Scania type 1664 7,755cc 160 hp (120 kW)
- Power/weight: 14,8 hp/t
- Fuel capacity: 250 L (66 US gal) of light bentol
- Maximum speed: 40 km/h (25 mph)

Landsverk L-62 Anti, (Note: The name Anti was introduced after the L-62 name, eventually superseding it.) later simply Landsverk Anti, was a Swedish self-propelled anti-aircraft gun, developed by AB Landsverk during the 1930s for export. A production license was bought by Hungary in 1940, as the modified 40M Nimród, and six vehicles of the improved Anti II variant was exported to Finland in 1942.

== Construction ==
The chassis was based on the Landsverk L-60 tank but was lengthened and reworked with one extra roadwheel per side. The turret was circular and open for a better view against planes. The gun was a Bofors 40 mm Automatic Gun L/60.

The initial design, later dubbed Anti I, was sold to Hungary for license production as the 40M Nimród. The Hungarians improved the design by reworking the turret. Forward protection was increased and the rear turret was extended backwards to make room for a second loader.

Landsverk would in turn introduce a new design with improved protection, dubbed the Anti II, which went on to be bought by Finland in 1941, delivered in 1942.

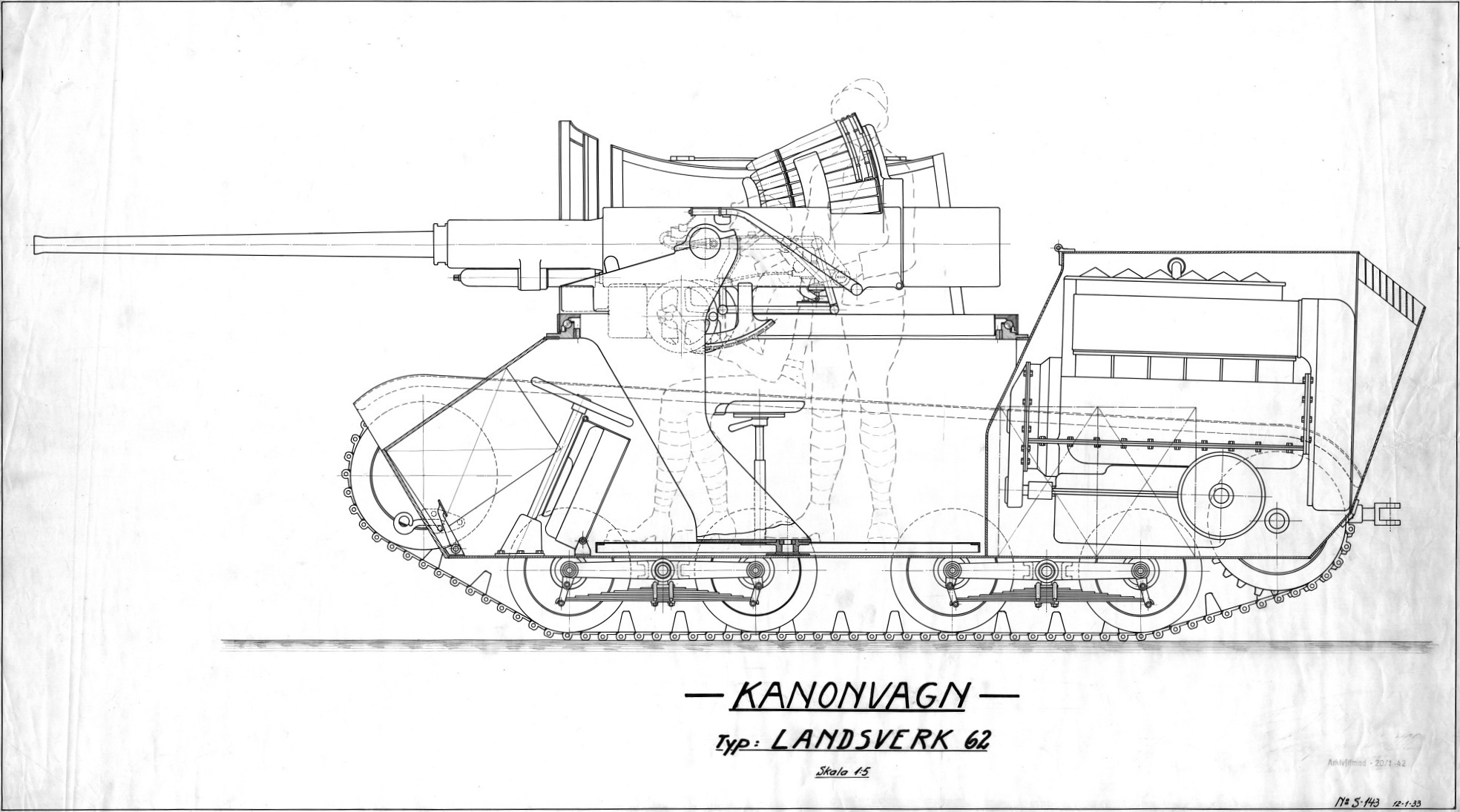
Draft for Landsverk L-62 Anti in 1933

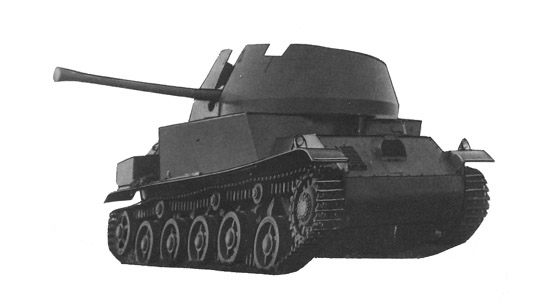
L-62 Anti I prototype with mockup gun

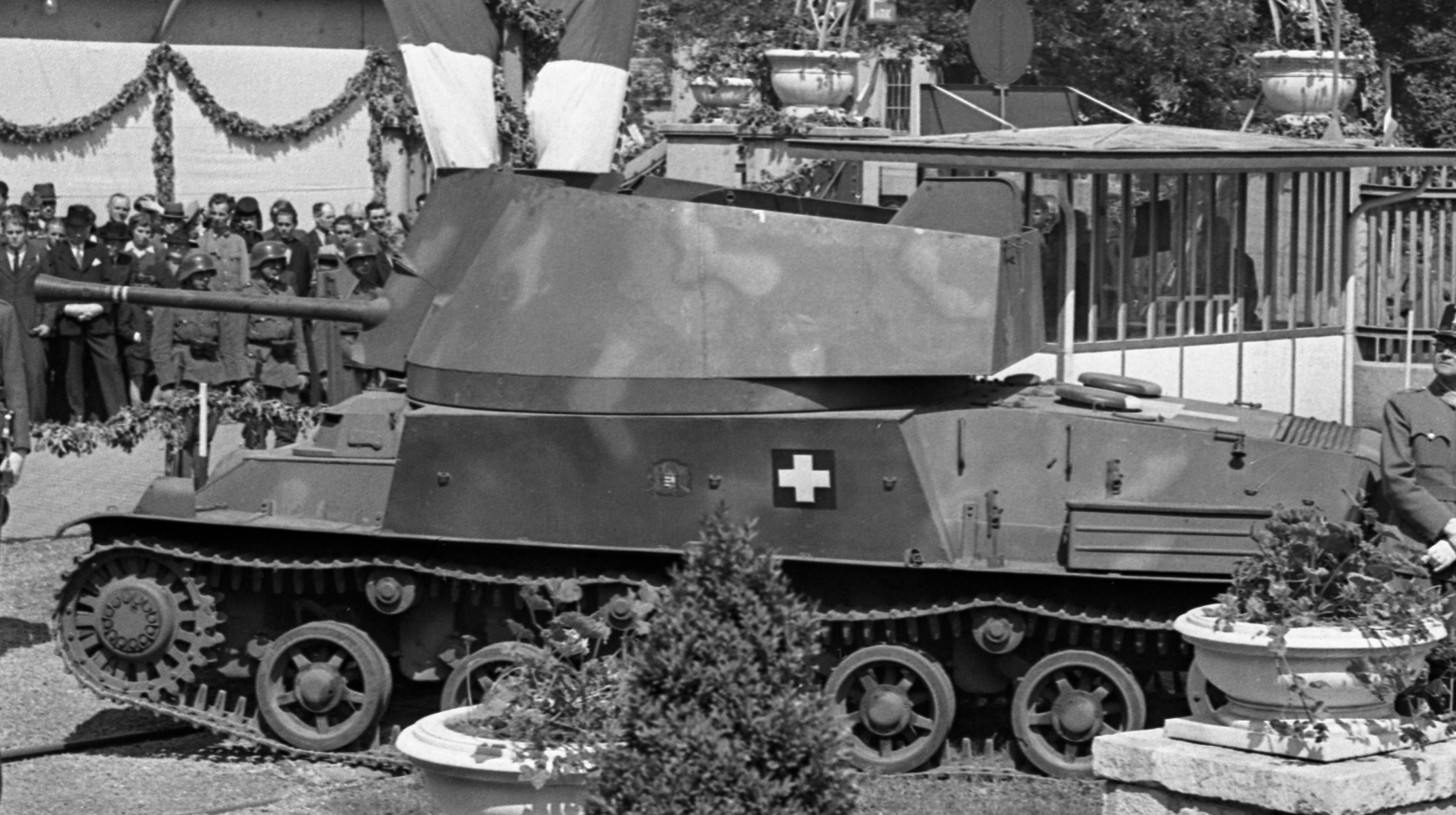
40M Nimród, Hungarian Anti I derivative

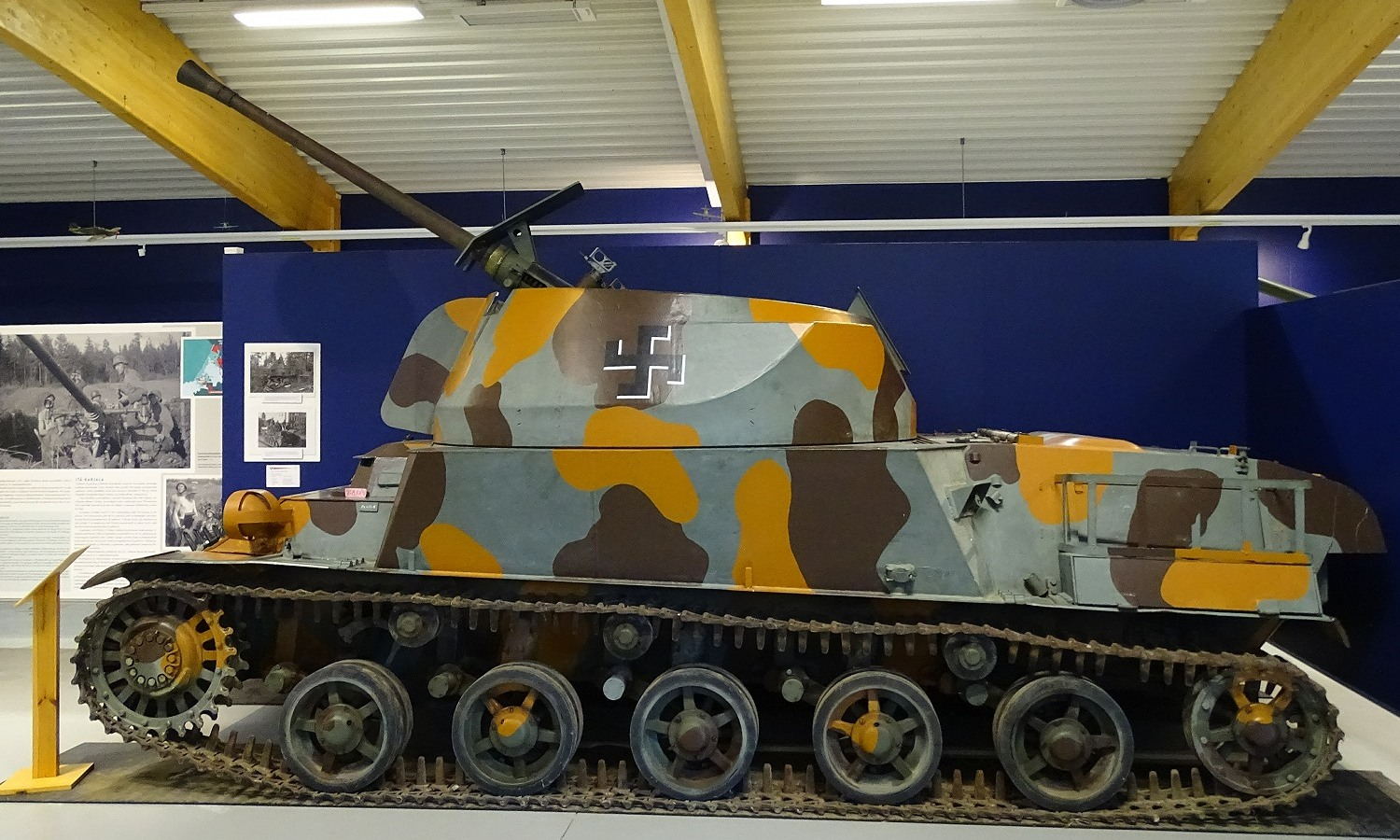
L-62 Anti II with improved protection

== Finland ==
In Finnish service the vehicle got the designation 10-tonnin ilmatorjuntapanssarivaunu mallia Anti (10 It.psv./Anti), lit. '10 ton anti-air tank model Anti', later redesignated as 10-tonnin ilmatorjuntapanssarivaunu 40 mm (10 itpsv 40), lit. '10 ton anti-air tank 40 mm'. Six vehicles were bought unarmed from Landsverk, instead being fitted with 40 ItK/38 license-produced guns by Valtion Kivääritehdas (VTT), the Finnish state rifle factory.

During the battles in the summer of 1944, the Finnish tanks downed eleven Soviet aircraft and thus prevented attacks against the tank brigade. All vehicles survived the war and were used until 1966. Several are part of museum exhibitions in modern times.

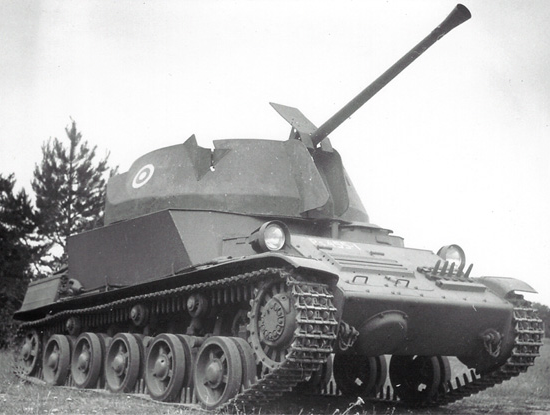
Landsverk L-62 Anti II in Finnish service

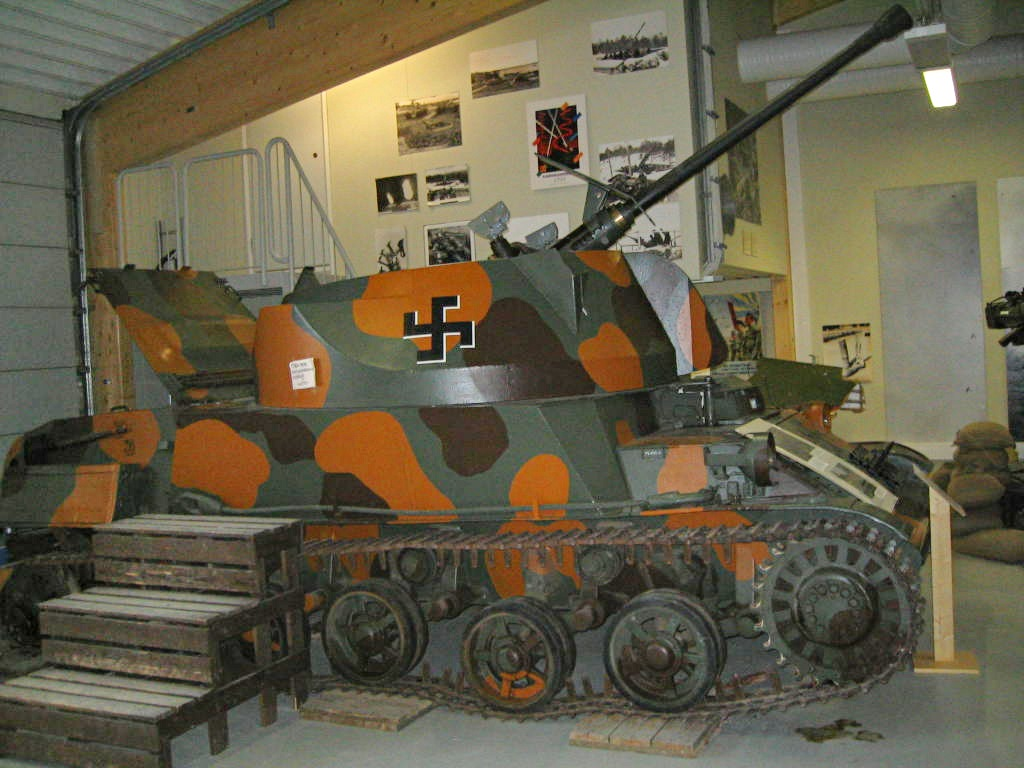
Landsverk Anti-II at the anti-aircraft museum in Tuusula, Finland

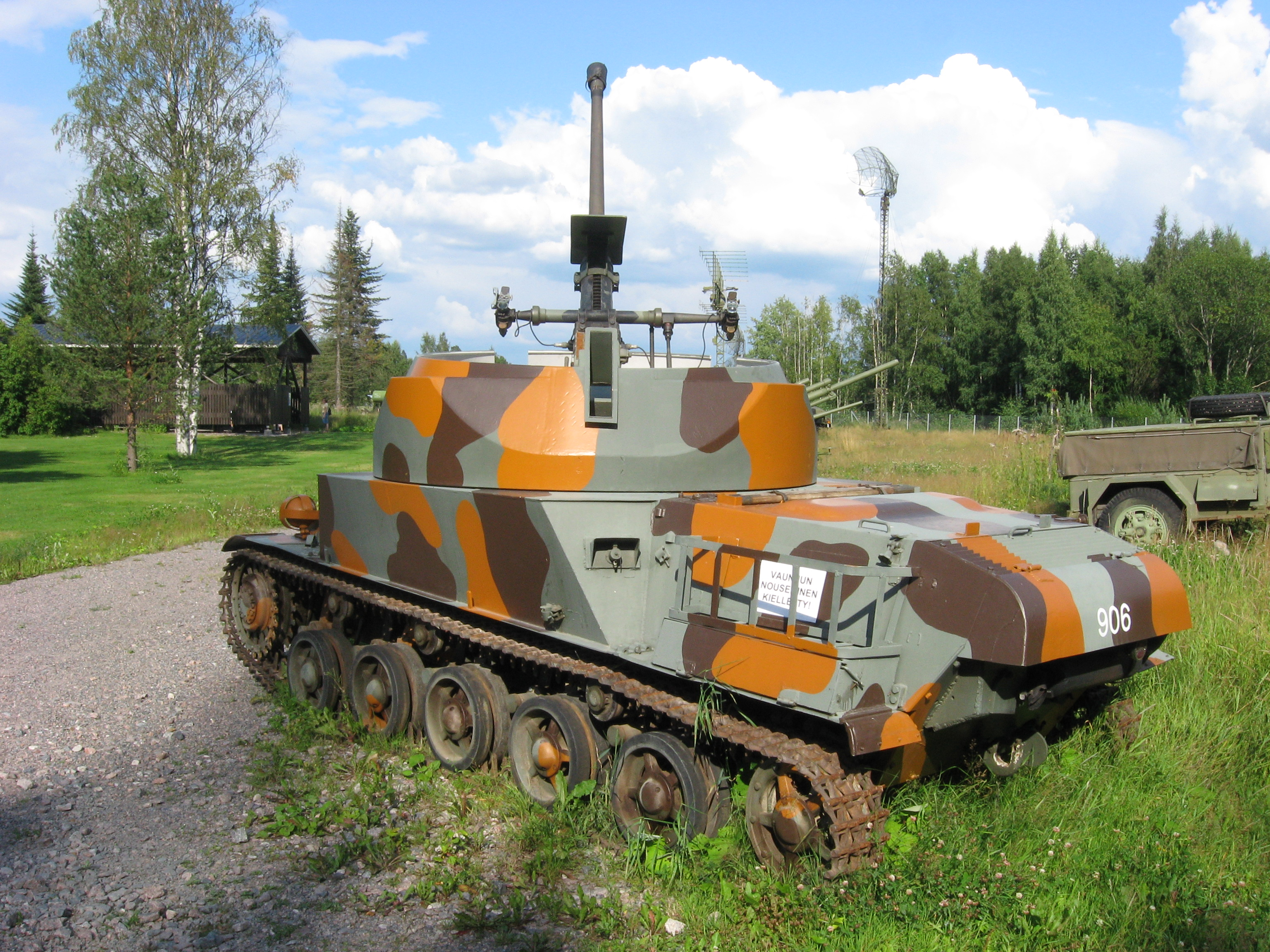
Landsverk Anti II at the anti-aircraft museum in Tuusula, Finland

== Variants ==
Main variants

- L-62 Anti I – initial variant, one prototype built
- L-62 Anti II – improved variant, 6 built for Finland
- 40M Nimród – license produced modification for Hungary

Projects

- L-62 – Landsverk L-60 anti-aircraft derivative, armed with a Bofors 40 mm L/60 gun
- L-63 – Landsverk L-60 anti-aircraft derivative, armed with a Bofors 25 mm M/32
- L-64 – Landsverk L-60 anti-aircraft derivative, armed with a Oerlikon 20 mm Type L cannon
- L-65 – Landsverk L-60 anti-aircraft derivative, armed with a Bofors 47 mm Automatic Gun L/45
