= ZK-383 =

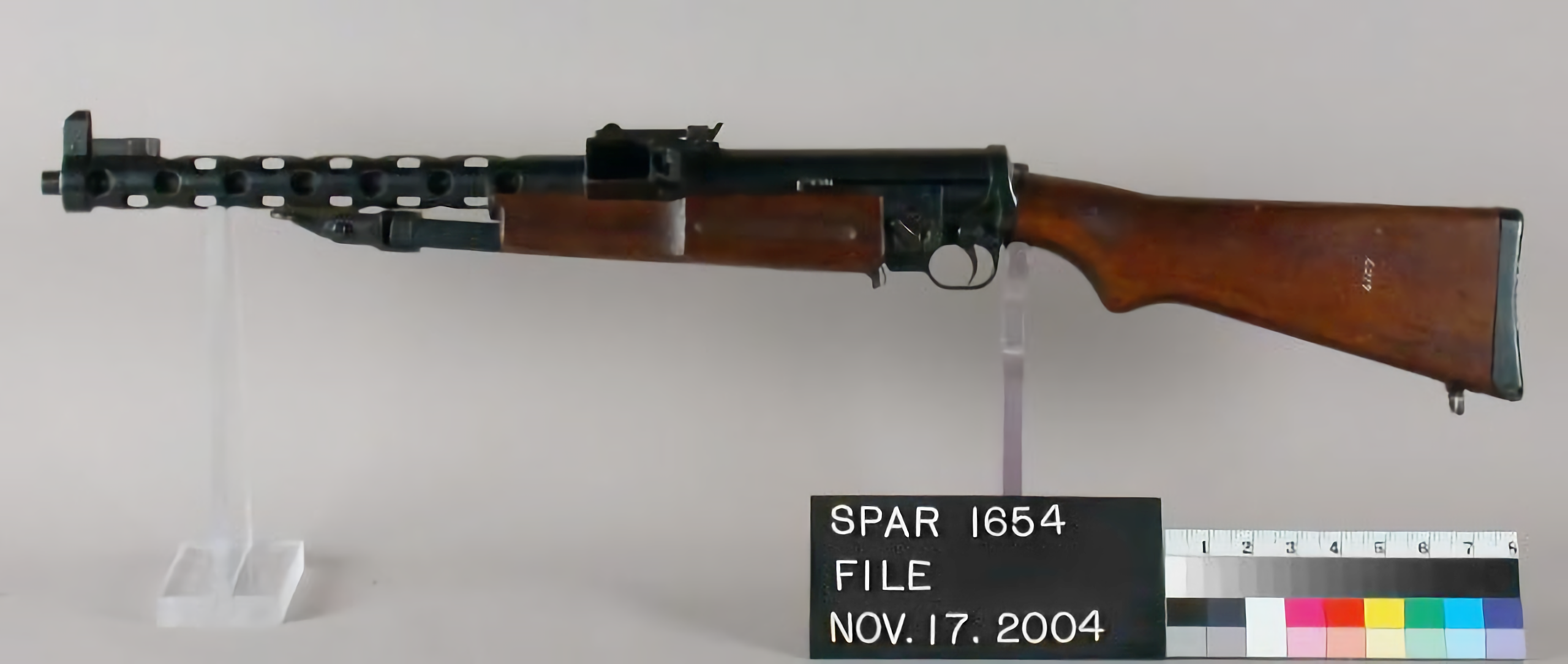
- ZK–383 at the Springfield Armory Museum
- Type: Submachine gun Squad Automatic Weapon
- Place of origin: Czechoslovakia

Service history
- In service: 1938–1970
- Used by: See Users
- Wars: World War II

Production history
- Designer: Koucký brothers
- Designed: 1930
- Produced: 1938–1948
- No. built: Approx 35,000

Specifications (ZK-383)
- Mass: 4.83 kg (10.6 lb)
- Length: 875 mm (34.4 in)
- Barrel length: 325 mm (12.8 in)
- Cartridge: 9×19mm Parabellum
- Action: Blowback
- Rate of fire: 500–700 rounds/min, variable
- Muzzle velocity: 460 m/s (1,500 ft/s)
- Effective firing range: 250 m (270 yd)
- Feed system: 30, 40 round detachable box magazine

The ZK-383 is a submachine gun developed by the Koucký brothers, who worked at the pre-war Československá zbrojovka, akc.spol. (under its name of Zbrojovka Brno after World War II) arms factory in Brno, Czechoslovakia. It was produced at a slow rate from 1938 onwards and was exported as far away as Bolivia and Venezuela.

== History ==
The ZK-383 was exported to many smaller European countries following its production start date in 1938. The production of the ZK-383 continued at Brno arms factory even during the German occupation during World War II. Most of the guns produced were supplied to the Waffen-SS. It continued to be produced in small numbers in the postwar period and production ended in 1948. The ZK-383 was slowly phased out by smaller and lighter submachine guns such as the Sa vz. 23. Bulgaria continued using it until the 1970s.

== Design ==
The ZK-383 was originally designed to be a squad automatic weapon much like the British Bren and Soviet DP27, despite it shooting a pistol round and not a full sized rifle cartridge. It became an individual submachine gun which resembles the German MP 18. For a submachine gun, the ZK-383 was a heavy and robustly made weapon. Military versions possessed detachable barrels, an integrated bipod, and rifle type sights, components considered unusual in submachineguns of the era. The police variant, designated the ZK-383-P, lacked these features, as did the postwar ZK-383-H.

== Features ==
The ZK-383 was fitted with a quickly detachable barrel. The lock/release mechanism was located beneath the front sight. It fires from an open bolt and by removing the bolt weight, the shooter could change the cyclic rate from 450 to 750 rpm. The magazine fed in from the left hand side like the British Sten. The manual safety was located in front of the trigger on the left side of the weapon. The ZK-383 had two firing modes, semi- and full-auto. Selection was made via the use of a short or long trigger pull. The stock was made from wood and had a folding bipod. The guns featured a hooded front sight and a rear adjustable tangent iron sight.

== Variants ==
- ZK-383; Standard production model
- ZK-383-P; Police version, lacking a folding bipod and detachable barrel
- ZK-383-H; Post-war production version which also lacked a bipod and detachable barrel; instead of a left side magazine, this model had a forward-facing underslung magazine

== Users ==
- Bolivia
- Brazil
- Bulgaria
- Czechoslovakia
- Germany
- Romania
- Slovakia
- Venezuela
- Yugoslav Partisans

== See also ==
- Weapons of Czechoslovakia interwar period
- Beretta Model 38
- Light Machine Gun
- PPD-40
- Suomi KP/-31
