= Axvall =

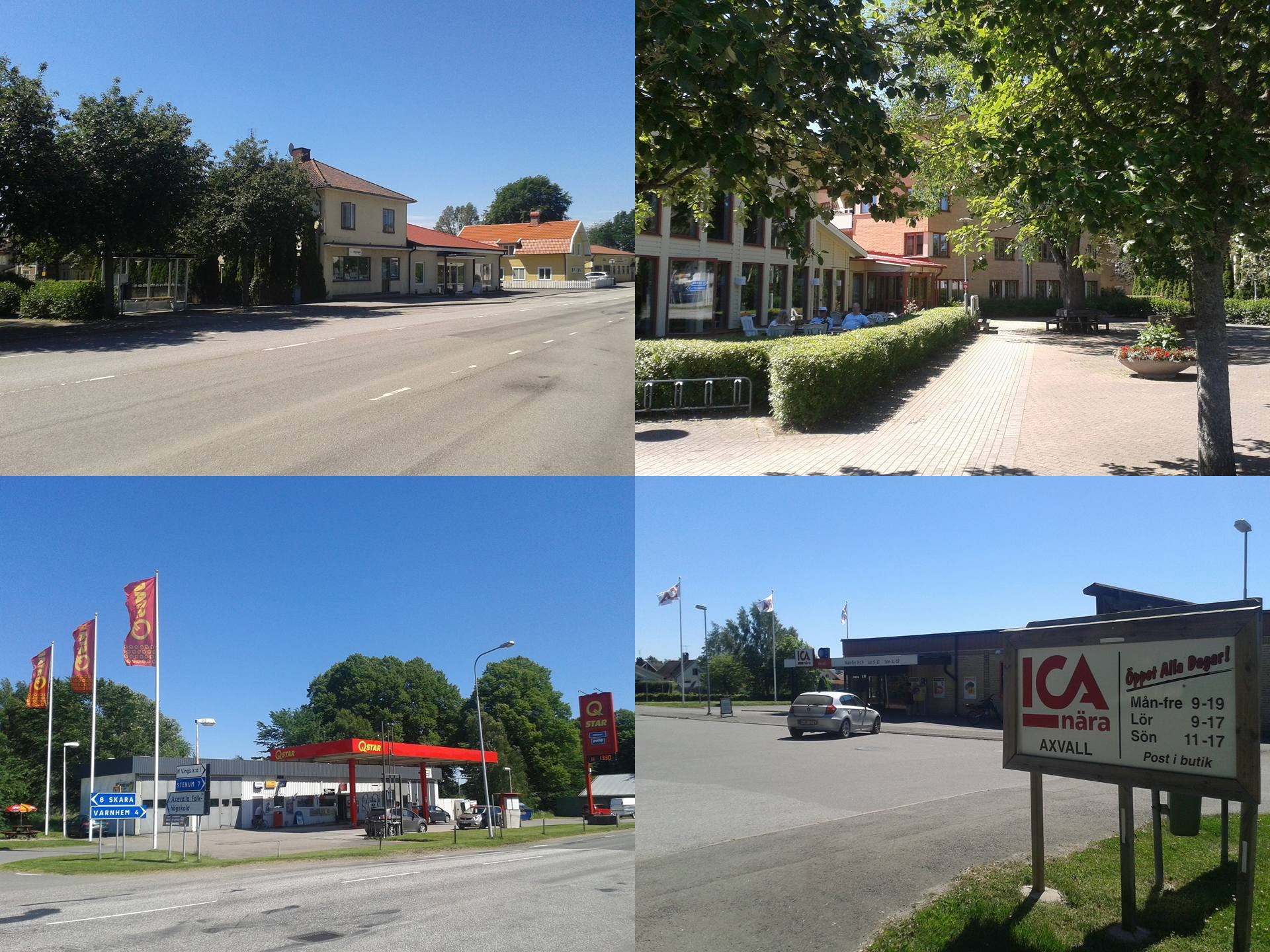
- Axvall

- Location within Västra Götaland Location within Sweden
- Coordinates: 58°23′N 13°34′E
- Country: Sweden
- Province: Västergötland
- County: Västra Götaland County
- Municipality: Skara Municipality

Area
  - Total: 1.10 km^{2} (0.42 sq mi)

Population (31 December 2010)
  - Total: 1,186
  - Density: 1,075/km^{2} (2,780/sq mi)
- Time zone: UTC+1 (CET)
  - Summer (DST): UTC+2 (CEST)
- Climate: Dfb

Axvall is a locality situated in Skara Municipality, Västra Götaland County, Sweden with 1,186 inhabitants in 2010.

== See also ==
- Axevalla House (castle ruins)
