= Landsverk L-185 =

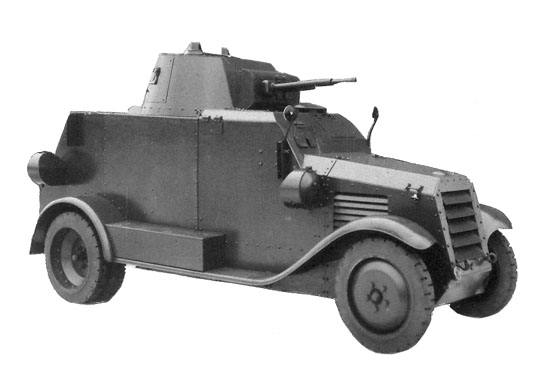
- Type: Armored car
- Place of origin: Sweden

Service history
- In service: 1934—1939
- Used by: Denmark
- Wars: World War II

Production history
- Designer: AB Landsverk
- Manufacturer: AB Landsverk
- Produced: 1934
- No. built: 1

Specifications
- Mass: 4,500 kg (9,900 lb)
- Crew: 4 — commander, driver, gunner and loader
- Main armament: 20 mm cannon or Madsen 20mm cannon (Danish L-185)
- Secondary armament: 2 or 3 machine guns or 2 × Madsen machine guns (Danish L-185)
- Engine: Ford; 85 hp
- Suspension: 4 x 4
- Maximum speed: 80 km/h (50 mph); 45 km/h (28 mph) (Danish L-185)

The Landsverk L-185 was a Swedish armored car, developed by AB Landsverk in 1933. The L-185 wasn't used by the Swedish Army. In 1934, a modified L-185, built on a 4 x 4 Fordson chassis, was sold to Denmark, being 2.5 tons heavier than the original and it was issued to the Army Technical Corps of the Danish Army, under the Danish designation FP-6. Following an engine failure in the 1937, the L-185 was relegated to the training role in 1939.

== See also ==
Landsverk L-180, L-181 and L-182 — A family of similar armored cars made by Landsverk.
