= Landsverk Lynx =

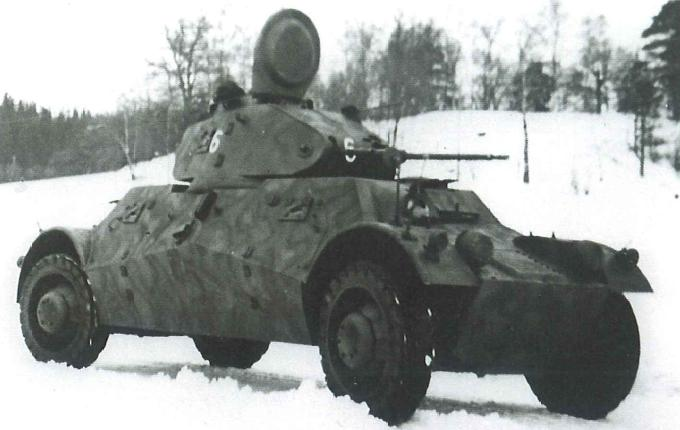
- Swedish pbil m/39 Lynx
- Type: Armoured car
- Place of origin: Sweden

Service history
- In service: 1939–1940 (Denmark); 1939–1958 (Sweden); 1956–1990 (Dominican Republic)
- Used by: Denmark; Sweden; Dominican Republic
- Wars: World War II; Dominican Civil War

Production history
- Designer: AB Landsverk
- Manufacturer: AB Landsverk, Volvo
- Produced: 1939-1941
- No. built: 48
- Variants: PV M39; Pbil m/39 Pbil m/40

Specifications (pbil m/39)
- Mass: 7.8 t (7.7 long tons; 8.6 short tons)
- Length: 5.1 m (16 ft 9 in)
- Width: 2.28 m (7 ft 6 in)
- Height: 2.2 m (7 ft 3 in)
- Crew: 6
- Armor: up to 13 mm (0.51 in)
- Main armament: 1 × 20 mm Bofors cannon
- Secondary armament: 3 × 30-cal Madsen or Browning machine guns
- Engine: Scania-Vabis (m/39); 135–142 hp (101–106 kW)
- Power/weight: 16.6-17.5 hp/t
- Suspension: 4 x 4
- Operational range: 200 km (120 mi)
- Maximum speed: 70 km/h (43 mph)
- Steering system: Four-wheel

The Landsverk Lynx was a series of Swedish 4x4 armoured cars developed by AB Landsverk just prior to World War II.

In Danish service it was designated as PV M39, in Swedish service as pansarbil m/39 (pbil m/39), or pansarbil m/40 (pbil m/40) for a later Volvo production series.

== History ==
AB Landsverk, who had developed the L-180, L-181 and L-182 family of armored cars, began developing the Lynx in 1937 as a private project. Sweden was not particularly interested so AB Landsverk pitted it against the British Alvis-Straussler AC3 (Note: Nicholas Straussler and Alvis Car and Engineering Company) in Denmark, after which an order for 18 vehicles were placed by the Danish army. The first prototype was available for trials in January 1938 and three vehicles were shipped to Denmark in April 1938, outfitted with a Madsen 20 mm cannon and Madsen machine guns. Fifteen more vehicles were supposed to be delivered to Denmark but the German invasion of Denmark in 1940 derailed this plan and the vehicles were instead requisitioned by Sweden, refitted with new turrets and 20 mm cannons from Bofors and designated pansarbil m/39 ("armored car m/39"). Thirty more vehicles were ordered by Sweden but, since Landsverk did not have the capacity to produce them, the contract was fulfilled by Volvo and these vehicles were designated pansarbil m/40 due to a variety of changes, such as being fitted with 145 hp Volvo engines.

== Characteristics ==
The Lynx had a low slung body with well sloped, but thin, armor and used a modified Landsverk L-60 turret. The 140 hp Scania-Vabis engine was in the middle on the left side. It was able to be driven from both the front and the rear and featured a crew of six (commander, 3 gunners, and front and rear drivers). All models were armed with three machine guns and a main autocannon. Wheels were produced by Overman Gummifabriks AB Sundbyberg.

== Operational history ==
The three Lynx delivered to Denmark were numbered PV9, PV10 and PV11, which formed the basis of two armored car squadrons attached to cavalry regiments. These were captured and used by German police units. Between 1941 and 1943 the Swedish m/40 models were completed and participated in exercises with reconnaissance units. In 1956 thirteen Pansarbils were sold to the Dominican Republic.
