= Tanks of the Polish Armoured Forces =

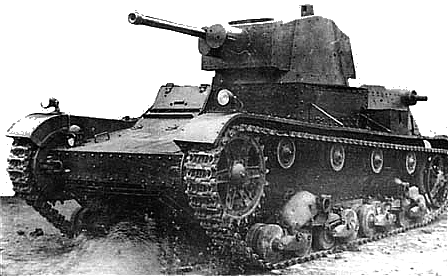
Polish Single turret 7TP tank.

This article deals with the history and development of tanks of the Polish army from their first use after World War I, into the interwar period, during World War II, the Cold War and modern era.

== Overview ==
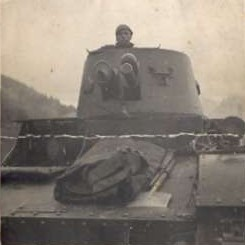
Polish Vickers E in 1938

During and after World War I, Britain and France were the intellectual leaders in tank design, with other countries generally following and adopting their designs. After World War I, many nations needed to have tanks, but only a few had the industrial resources to design and build them. Poland designed tanks from those it acquired and the Polish armoured forces were given the single turret 7TP tank which was the best Polish tank available in numbers when the war broke out, derived from the Vickers Mark E tank. The Polish forces with the 7TP Light Tank series put up a valiant defense against the invading German Army in the opening phases of World War 2, and although the new Polish 9TP tanks were being produced, few reached the Polish forces before the German invasion overwhelmed the Polish army. Poland acquired and developed tanks and tankettes for its armoured forces and after Poland had been overrun, a government-in-exile (headquartered in Britain), armed forces, along with an intelligence service were established outside of Poland. They contributed to the Allied effort throughout the war. The Polish Army was recreated in the West, as well as in the East (after German invasion of the Soviet Union).

== Inter War ==
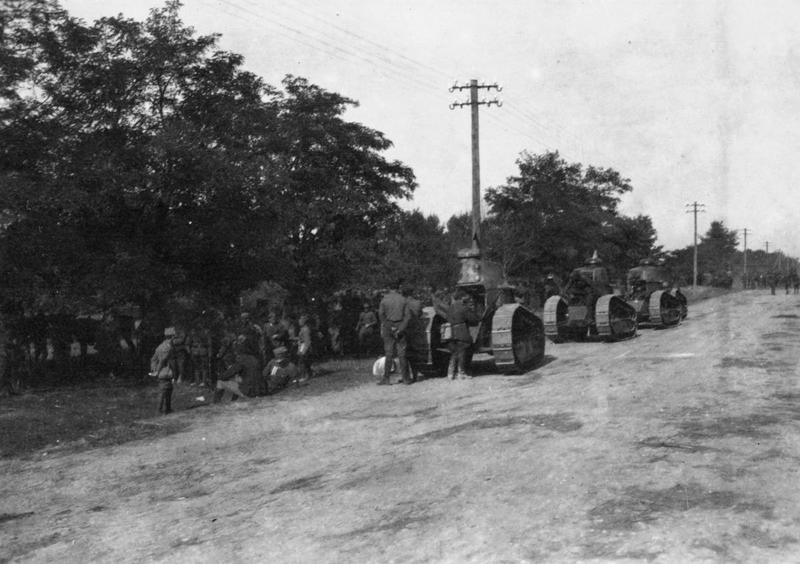
The Blue Army included the 1st Tank Regiment of 120 Renault FT tanks, the fourth largest tank unit of the world.

After World War I the Polish Armed Forces received the Renault FT light tank, with 174 FTs being used by its forces. In 1918 the newly organized Polish 1st Tank Regiment (1 Pułk Czołgów) had been equipped with 120 of these tanks. The 1st Tank Regiment consisted of four tank companies organised into two Battalions and saw fighting during the Polish–Ukrainian War after the dissolution of Austria-Hungary in a Polish offensive in Volhynia and Eastern Galicia carried out by units of the Polish Army aided by the newly arrived Blue Army of General Józef Haller de Hallenburg. This army, composed of Polish forces which had fought for the Entente on the Western front, numbering 60,000 troops, came with tanks supplied by the Western allies and partially staffed with experienced French officers. The unit was based on equipment and part of personnel of former French 505th Tank Regiment, and was equipped with the most modern tanks of the time, the Renault FT. After the war the 1st Tank Regiment, along with Gen. Haller's Army, returned to Poland, with all equipment. Thanks to this, Poland became the fourth biggest armoured power in the world at that time.

They also participated in the Polish-Soviet War, which by 1920 most of the French personnel had departed back to France. In July 1920, FTs tanks were used in the Defense of Grodno and defense of Lida, and Rowne as well as the Battle of Daugavpils. Then, they took part in the Battle of Warsaw in August 1920 and some damaged tanks were put on railway flatcars and used as parts of armored trains.

In 1924, 6 Renault TSF radio command tanks were bought in France. They were based upon the FT hull, fitted with a radio in a big superstructure in a place of a turret. They were not armed. Also, in 1929-1930, some of newer Renault tank designs were bought. They were 5 Renault M26/27 tanks and 1 Renault NC-27 tank. The M26/27 was a development of the FT, with the same hull and armament, fitted with a new track mechanism and with Kegresse rubber tracks. The Renault NC-27 was a further development of the FT, with a redesigned hull and new chassis, but a turret with gun or MG armament remained similar (they were proposed to the French Army under the designation NC-1; its further development led to the French D1 tank).

The Polish Armed Forces looked at the Carden-Loyd Mk.VI tankette and it met with an interest in Poland as it did in many other countries. As soon as in 1929 one tankette was bought and evaluated in Poland and it was decided to buy 10 tankettes Mk.VI and 5 tracked trailers. They were delivered in August 1929 and after divisional manoeuvres in September 1929, it was evaluated, that the tankettes fulfilled the needs of a reconnaissance vehicle for both infantry and cavalry. The TK (also known as the TK-3) tankette was a Polish design produced from 1931 that was based upon an improved chassis of the British Carden Loyd tankette. The TKS was an improved model with a new hull and a more powerful engine. The armour of the TK was up to 8 mm thick (10 mm on the TKS). In 1939, re-arming of the tankettes with 38FK 20 mm machine guns began, but only about 24 were completed before the outbreak of World War II.

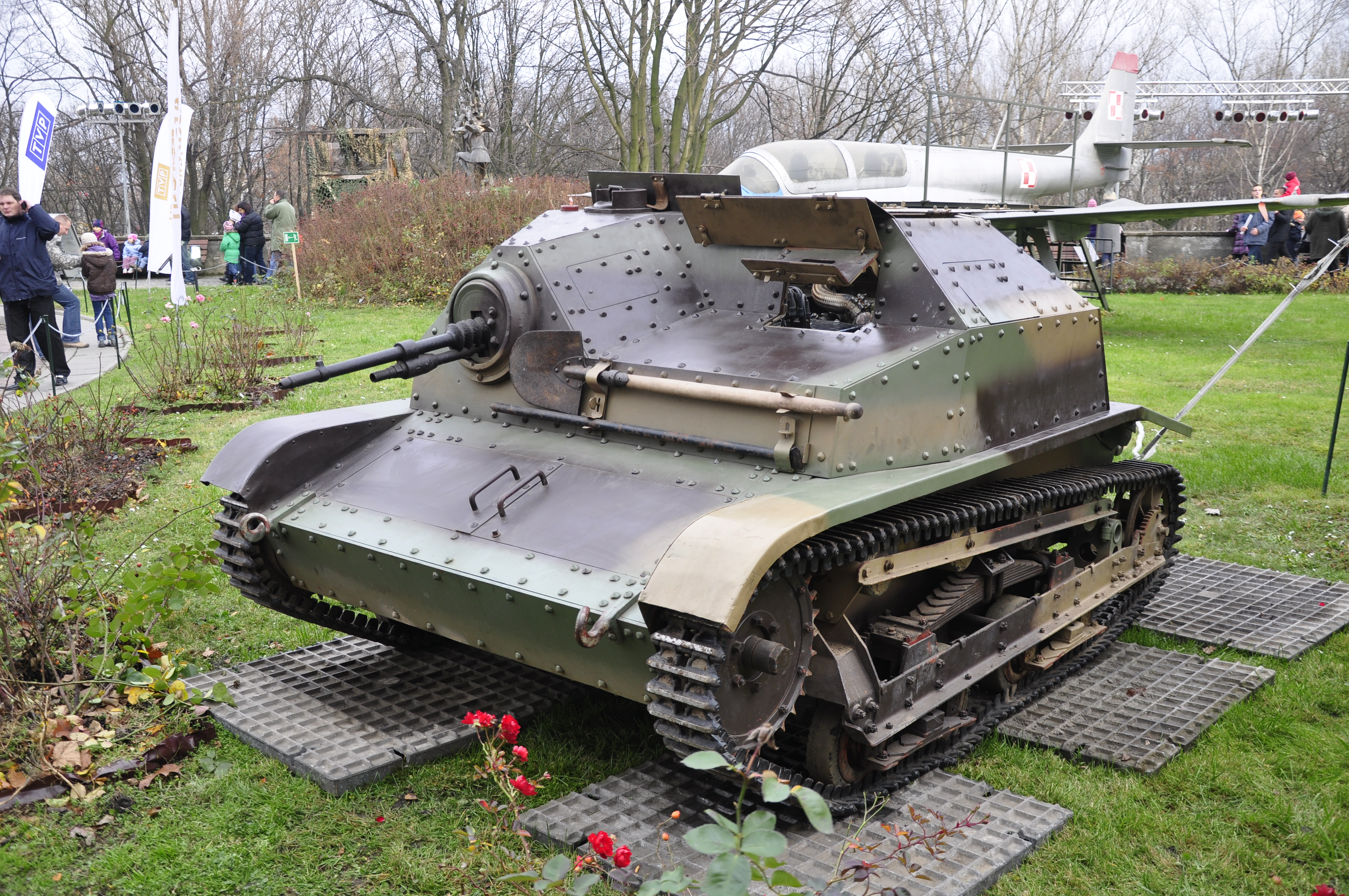
TKS tankette in Polish Army Museum

Their advantages were: mobility, good obstacle crossing and small dimensions, making them difficult to spot. It was estimated, that they fit better as cavalry reconnaissance vehicles, than newly acquired wz.28 halftrack armoured cars. As a result, the Polish authorities decided to buy a licence for manufacturing Carden-Loyd Mk.VI.However, instead of producing Carden-Loyd Mk.VI, the Polish authorities decided to work an own, improved model, only generally basing on Carden-Loyd's composition which came to be known as the light reconnaissance tank TK-3 (also known simply as the TK) and a total of 300 TK-3 tankettes were built.

At the end of the 1920s, the Polish Armed Forces felt that they also needed a new tank model. The Military Institute of Engineering Research (Wojskowy Instytut Badań Inżynierii, WIBI) sent Captain Ruciński to the United States to legally acquire a Christie M1928 tank, its blueprint and license. The tank was to be used as a base for a new Polish light tank. The Poles however never received the machine and Christie fearing legal charges, refunded the purchase.

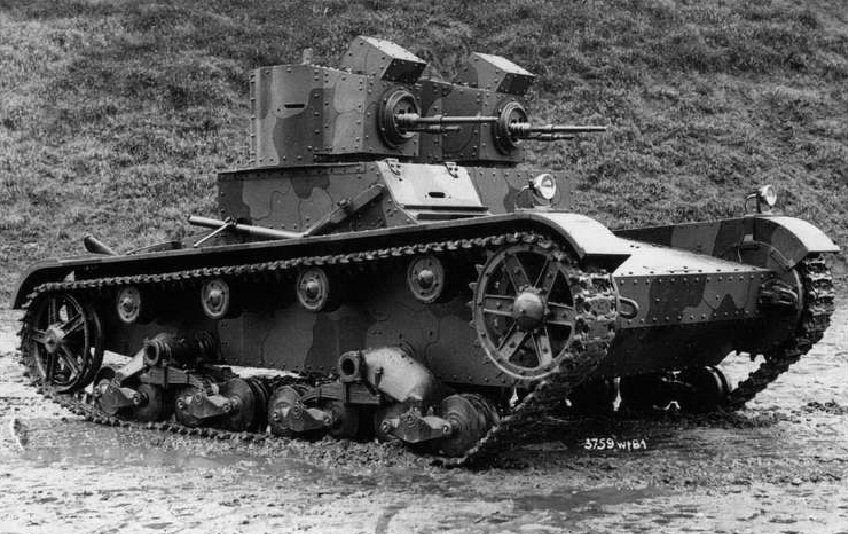
Polish Vickers Mark E 6-Ton Tank

Due to this failure to purchase the master model and the possible license, at the end of 1930 the WIBI Tank Design Bureau began preliminary design work on their own wheeled/tracked tank, based on the Christie M1928 and Christie M1931 models, known under the working name "A la Christie".

The work was based on available data and advertising leaflets as well as notes and sketches that Captain Ruciński obtained from Christie. In 1932 the design drawings and a list of details were ready but soon the work slowed down because the designers were put in charge of a just-bought British Vickers Mark E tank that led to the 7TP light tank which was developed soon after. On 14 September 1931, Poland bought 38 tanks Vickers Mk.E Type A, with spare parts and a manufacturing licence.

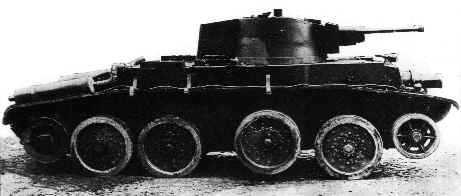
The Polish light cruiser tank 10TP Medium tank.

At the end of 1934, because of the liquidation of WIBI and establishing of the Design and Testing Centre of the Armoured Forces reporting directly to the Armoured Forces Command, most of the "A la Christie" project documentation was destroyed under the supervision of a special commission. Only a few hand-written notes and calculations were left.

On 10 March 1935 design work on a new model called 10TP was started. Major Rudolf Gundlach headed the design team consisting of, among the others, engineers Jan Łapuszewski, Stefan Ołdakowski, Mieczysław Staszewski, Kazimierz Hejnowicz and a process engineer Jerzy Napiórkowski.

Despite the fact that in 1936 the vehicle design was not completely finished, it was included in the programme of Armoured Forces that was a part of a general projection of growth and upgrade for the Polish Army for 1936-1942. This programme was approved by the Armament and Equipment Committee (Komitet do spraw Uzbrojenia i Sprzętu, KSUS) in January 1936. The 10TP tank was specified on the list of the equipment scheduled for four tank battalions in the new motorised units. Around this time a large number of the Polish FTs were sold fictitiously to Uruguay and China, and in fact went to Republican Spain.

Assembly of the first tank prototype was commenced in 1937 in the Experimental Workshop (WD) located within the area of the State Engineering Plants (PZInż.) Factory in Ursus near Warsaw, where all Polish tanks were produced in the period of 1931-1939. The work was supervised by Captain Kazimierz Grüner. At the same time two motorised cavalry brigades were formed with the intention that they would be equipped with the tank.

Building of the tank was completed in July 1938. It took so much time because some basic assemblies that were not produced in Poland had to be acquired abroad like an engine of a sufficient output. It was not before 16 August that the 10TP tank rolled out for a first longer ride. It was driven by an experienced military specialist Sergeant Polinarek under personal supervision of the Chief of the Trial and Experiment Department in the Bureau of Technical Studies on Armored Weapons (Biuro Badań Technicznych Broni Pancernych, BBT Br. Panc.) Captain Leon Czekalski. The trials were kept secret because the activities of the German Abwehr and the members of the "Fifth Column" were then getting more and more intensive in Poland.

Successive trials being stopped by minor faults lasted until 30 September and then the tank was sent to the WD where design modifications were made. On 16 January 1939 the tank was tested, under supervision of its Chief Designer along a short distance trip to Łowicz and in the spring between 22 and 25 April, it went beyond Grodno, traveling along a total distance of 610 km. After this trip, when a total of nearly 2000 km were logged, the vehicle was sent again to the WD where it was nearly completely stripped down to check the wear on particular parts and assemblies, identify causes of malfunctions and to repair the damage. In May, the refurbished tank was demonstrated to generals and other top ranking military authorities.

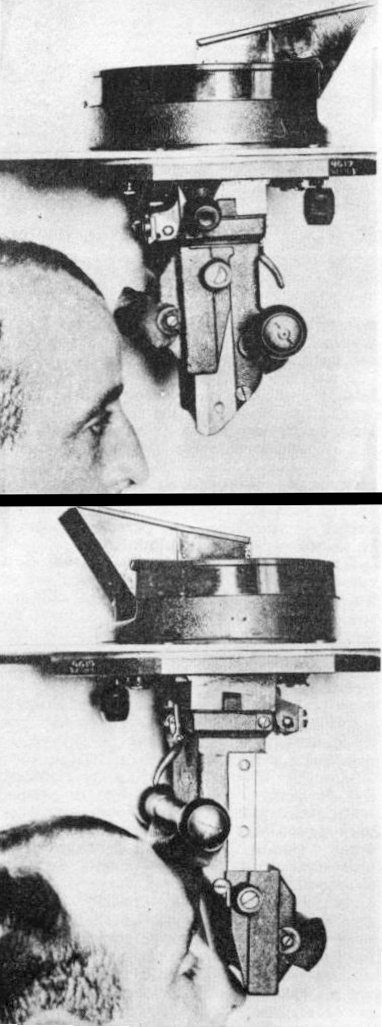
MK.IV Gundlach periscope

.

The designers, having analysed their experiences came to the conclusion that a tank of this type should be a purely tracked vehicle and any equipment needed for driving it on wheels was just an unnecessary weight. Getting rid of this weight allowed them to increase the armour thickness significantly while vehicle weight remained unchanged. Thus another development step of the 10TP was to be the 14TP tank. Its construction was started in the end of 1938 but it was not completed due to the war.

Before the tank could enter mass production, German invasion of Poland in September 1939 ended the independent existence of the Second Polish Republic.

Another route the Polish army took was to purchase some of the British designed Carden-Loyd Mark VI two man tankette (Poland ordered 10 or 11 of those two man tankettes on 29 June 1929. After the fall of Poland Polish units that made it to France used those two man tankettes in 1940) From this designed evolved the TK-3 tankette (based on TK-1 and TK-2 tankettes, about 300 built) and TKS tankette (based on TK-3 tankette, about 390 built) which were the only versions built in significant numbers.

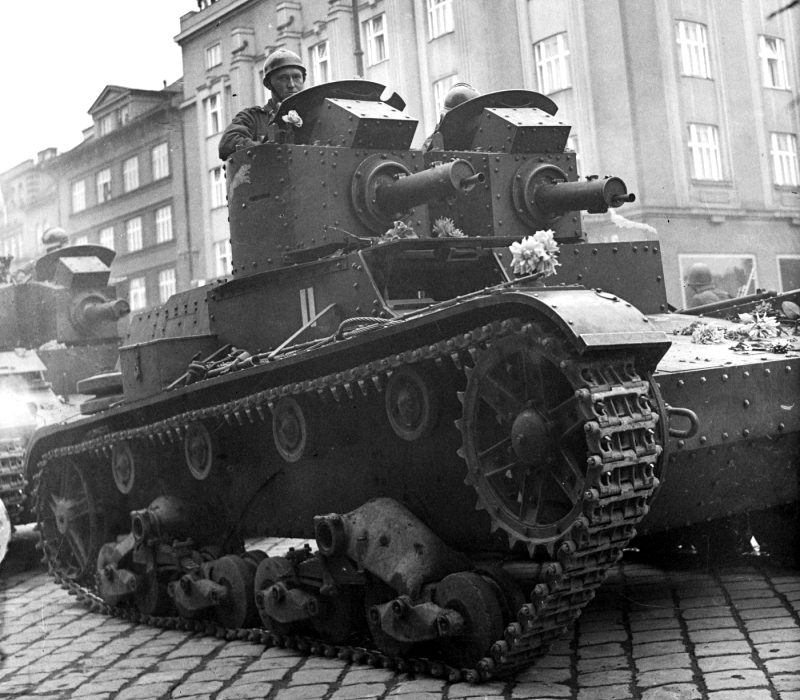
Polish 7 TP twin-turreted tank version

The Polish Armed Forces also received from the French the Renault Char léger Modèle 1935 R light Infantry tank (Poland used 50 of those tanks) and also the Hotchkiss Char léger modèle 1935 H (Three Hotchkiss Char léger modèle 1935 H tanks had been exported to Poland in July 1939 for testing by the Polish Bureau of Technical Studies of Armoured Weapons. From the British it acquired some 6-Ton Type A light tanks (also known as Vickers Mark E) The Polish army used 38 of these tanks with small improvements as 22 Type B and 16 Type A tanks. The Polish Armed Forces used these to design their own variations such as the 7TP dw and 7TP jw light tank.

The 7TP was the Polish development of the British Vickers 6-ton Mark E tank licence. Comparing to Vickers, the main new features of 7TP were: a better, more reliable and powerful diesel engine, a 37 mm anti-tank gun, thicker armour (17 mm instead of 13 mm on the front), modified ventilation, the Gundlach tank periscope, and a radio.

About 132 tanks were produced between 1935 and the outbreak of the war, plus four iron prototypes. The designation 7TP meant "7 Tonne, Polish" (in fact its weight increased to 9 tonnes after the initial prototype). The 7TP was fitted with the 360-degree tank periscope which was of Polish design and was first used in the Polish 7-TP light tank. Shortly before the war it was given to the British and became known as the Vickers Tank Periscope MK.IV and was used in almost all tanks of WWII, including the British Crusader, Churchill, Valentine, and Cromwell and the American Sherman. After the German and Soviet attack and fall Poland in 1939 it was copied entirely from captured 7TP and TKS Polish tanks and used in all 1940 and later tanks of the Germany (including the Tiger) and later by USSR (including the T-34 and T-70).

Another tank being developed was the 9TP (code for Polish: dziewięciotonowy polski - "9-tonne Polish") a Polish light tank. It was a development of the earlier 7TP tank, it was to replace its predecessor in Polish service in 1940. Due to the outbreak of the war, only a limited number of early prototypes and development versions took part in battles of the Invasion of Poland.

The 20/25TP (dwudziestotonowy polski/dwudziestopięciotonowy polski - 20-tonne Polish/25-tonne Polish) was a Polish medium tank concept that was never built. There were three projects designed by KSUS and BBTBr.Panc. and PZInż which even managed to build a wooden model of it

In 1938 the Polish Army bought two R 35 tanks for testing and received a supply of the Renault Char léger Modèle 1935 R light Infantry tank (Poland used 50 of those tanks). After a series of tests it was found that the design was completely unreliable and the Poles decided to buy the French SOMUA S35 tanks instead, a proposal that was later refused by the French government. However, as the threat of war became apparent and the production rate of the new Polish 7TP tank was insufficient, in April 1939 it was decided to buy a hundred R 35 tanks as an emergency measure. The first fifty (other sources lower the number to 49) arrived in Poland in July 1939, along with three Hotchkiss H35 tanks bought for testing. Most were put into service with the Łuck-based 12th Armoured Battalion. During the Invasion of Poland 45 tanks formed the core of the newly created 21st Light Tank Battalion that was part of the general reserve of the Commander in Chief. The unit was to defend the Romanian Bridgehead, but was divided after the Soviet invasion of Poland of 17 September. Thirty-four tanks were withdrawn to Romania, while the remaining tanks were pressed into service with the improvised Dubno Operational Group and took part in the battles of Krasne and Kamionka Strumiłowa. Six tanks were also attached to the 10th Motorized Cavalry Brigade. The second shipment of R 35 did not reach Poland prior to the outbreak of World War II and was redirected to Syria in October.

The Polish forces also had a 4TP light tank designed (Also known as PZInż.140 light tank) (only one prototype built). During the Invasion of Poland in 1939 the Hotchkiss Char léger modèle 1935 H tanks together with 3 Renault Char léger Modèle 1935 R tanks were incorporated into an ad hoc "half company" unit of lieutenant J.Jakubowicz formed on 14 September 1939 in Kiwerce, Poland. The unit joined the task force "Dubno" and lost all of its tanks during the marches and fighting with German and Soviet armies and Ukrainian insurgents.) They also had 38 of the Vickers 6-Ton Type A light tank (also known as Vickers Mark E) and also designed a 10TP light fast tank but only one prototype was built.

== World War II ==
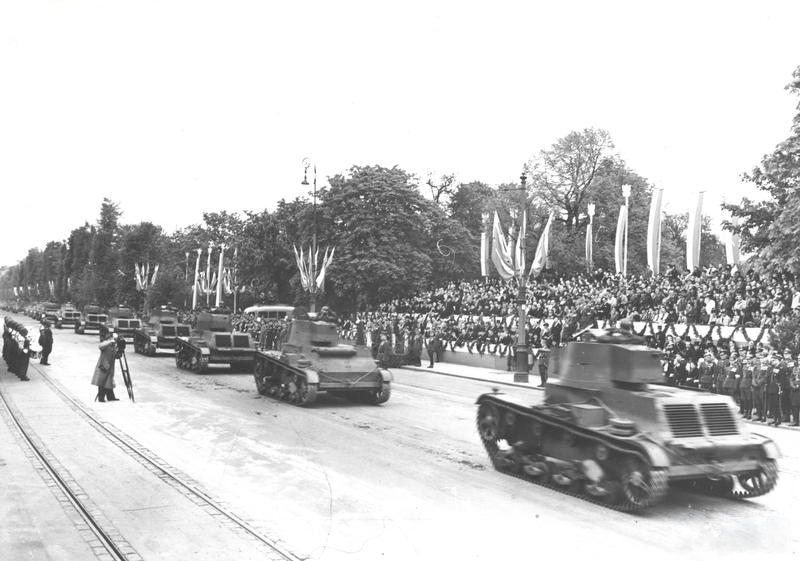
Early modified 7TP/9TP (second from the right) during a May 3rd Constitution Day parade in 1939

The German invasion of Poland began on 1 September 1939, one week after the signing of the Molotov–Ribbentrop Pact, while the Soviet invasion commenced on 17 September 1939 following the Molotov-Tōgō agreement which terminated the Nomonhan incident on 16 September 1939. Polish to Germany forces in the September Campaign: 1,000,000 soldiers 4,300 guns, 880 tanks, 435 aircraft (Poland) to 1,800,000 soldiers, 10,000 guns, 2,800 tanks, 3,000 aircraft (Germany). A comparison of both armed forces clearly indicates the problems faced by Poland. Germany had 11 tank divisions compared to Poland's 1; four motorised divisions compared to none in Poland; and 40 infantry divisions compared to Poland's 30. An army group led by von Rundstedt attacked from the south while another army group led by von Bock attacked from the north with large mechanised forces.

Before the war, between 1936 and 1939, Poland invested heavily in the Central Industrial Region. Preparations for a defensive war with Germany were ongoing for many years, but most plans assumed fighting would not begin before 1942. To raise funds for industrial development, Poland sold much of the modern equipment it produced. The Polish Army had approximately a million soldiers, but less than half were mobilized by 1 September. The Polish military had fewer armored forces than the Germans, and these units, dispersed within the infantry, were unable to effectively engage the enemy.

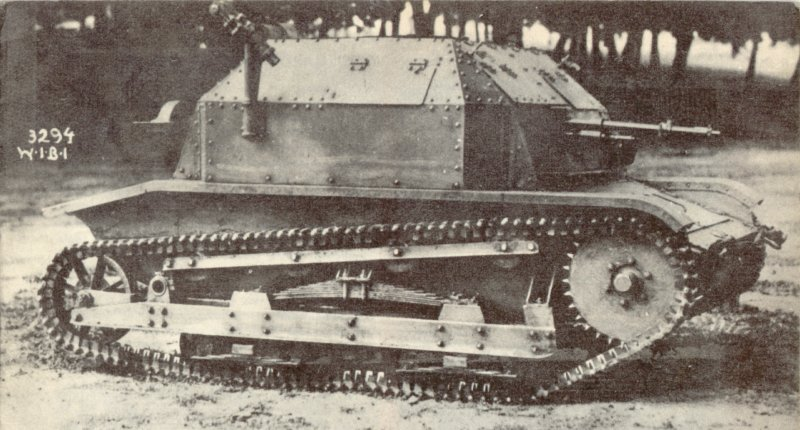
TK-3 tankette

The tank force consisted of two armored brigades, four independent tank battalions and some 30 companies of TKS tankettes attached to infantry divisions and cavalry brigades. The TK-3 (TK) and TKS light turretless reconnaissance tanks, commonly called tankettes (in Polish: tankietka), were the most numerous armoured vehicles of the Polish Army at the outbreak of World War II in September 1939. Their number of over 500 vehicles constituted formally a significant tank force. Unfortunately, they were not fully capable tanks, and, apart from few cannon-armed ones, could not fight against other armoured fighting vehicles.

Before the war, in 1939, the Polish Army still had 102 Renault FT light tanks, of which 70 formed the 2nd armoured battalion in Żurawica and 32 the two Armoured Trains Units (as armoured draisines). Some of these tanks were "iron" FT CWS. The combat usefulness of FT tanks in 1939 was very limited, since they were obsolete and extremely slow by the standards of the day, but they participated in the defense of Poland in September 1939; the 2nd Armoured Battalion formed three light tank companies (numbers: 111, 112, 113), equipped with Renault FT tanks.

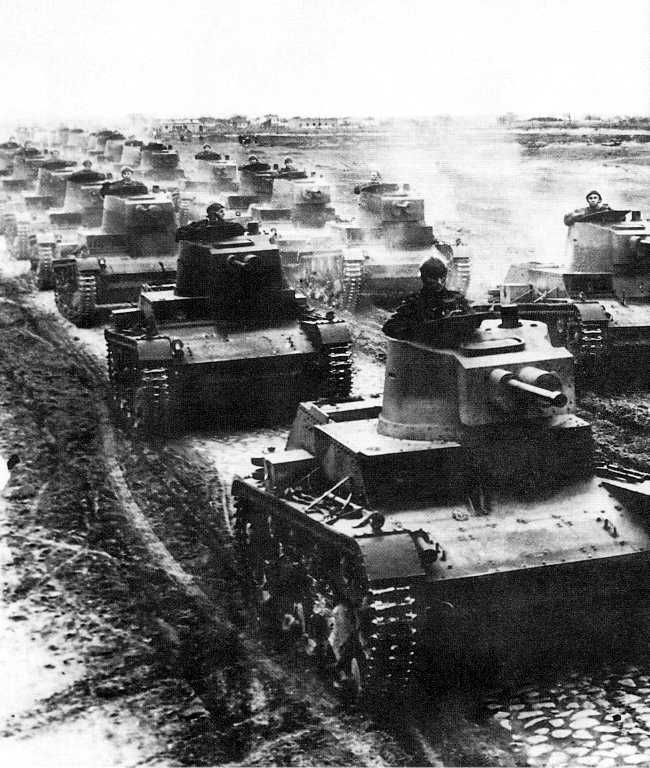
Polish 7TP light tanks in formation during the first days of the 1939 Defensive War

A standard tank of the Polish Army during the invasion of 1939 was the 7TP light tank. It was the first tank in the world to be equipped with a diesel engine and 360° Gundlach periscope. The 7TP was significantly better armed than its most common opponents, the German Panzer I and II, but only 140 tanks were produced between 1935 and the outbreak of the war. Poland had also a few relatively modern imported designs, such as 50 Renault R35 tanks and 38 Vickers E tanks. During the mobilization in August 1939, the Vickers tanks were used in two light tank companies of Polish only two motorized brigades. The 11th Armoured Battalion formed the 121st Light Tank Company for the 10th Cavalry Brigade, while the 2nd Armoured Battalion formed the 12th Light Tank Company for the Warsaw Armoured-Motorized Brigade (WBP-M). On 3 September 1939, the Polish tanks, attacking along Krzeczów W - Skomielna W road, twice repelled the infantry of the 2nd Panzer Division, which was attacking the flank of the 10th Mounted Rifle Rgt. The second unit to use Vickers tanks was the 12th Light Tank Company of the Warsaw Armoured-Motorized Brigade (WBP-M). During August and the first two weeks of September 1939, the brigade was being organized and trained, and stayed on the right bank of the Vistula. The first combat action was against the German bridgehead over the Vistula near Annopol.

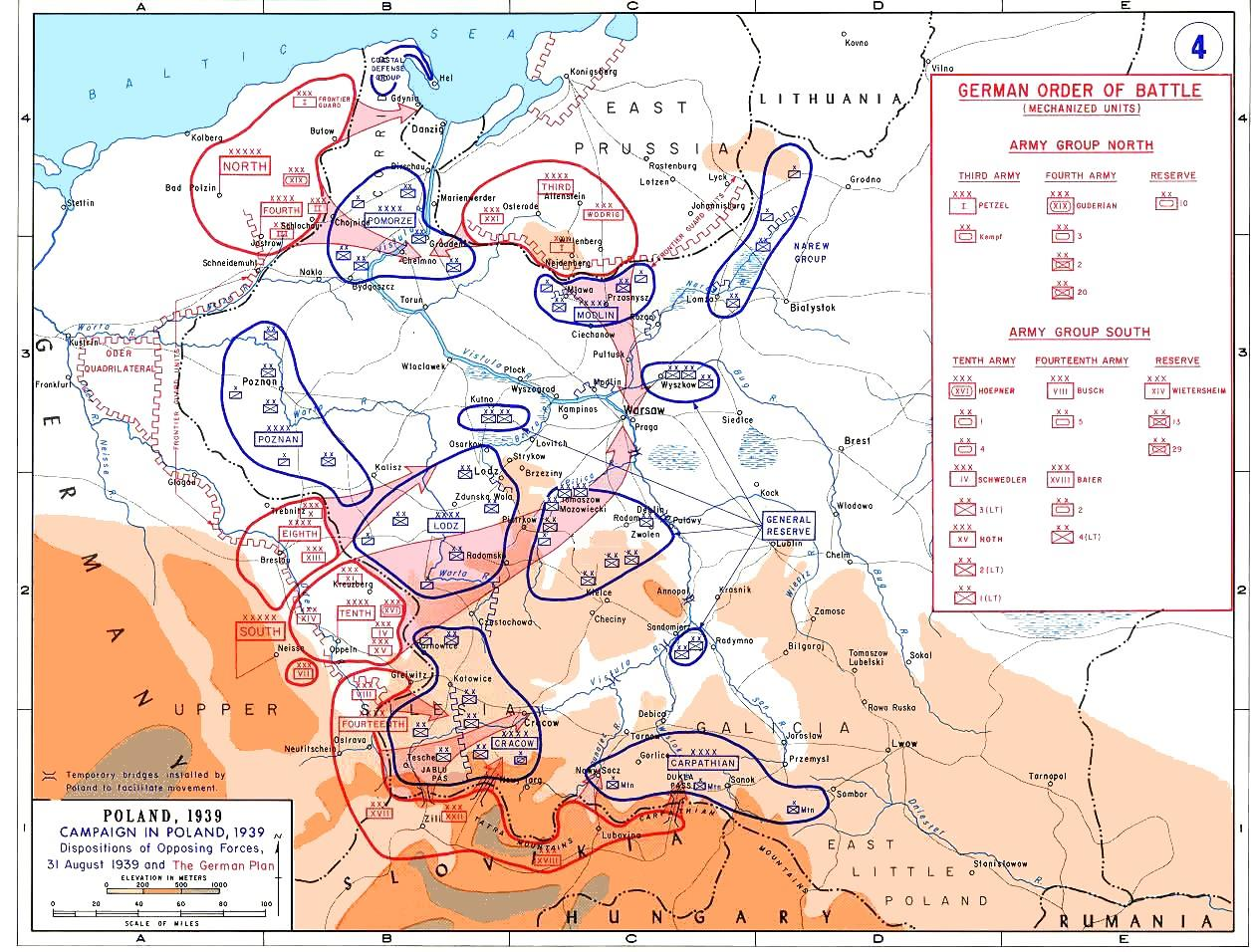
Forces as of 31 August and German plan of attack.

One of the main tank battles was at the Battle of Piotrków Trybunalski a battle which started with the German breakthrough during the Battle of Borowa Gora.

After the German breakthrough at Borowa Gora, the Germans and their tanks and soldiers headed for the Polish town of Piotrków Trybunalski. German tanks attacked the town, but Polish 155 mm howitzers destroyed several tanks and the Germans fell back, returning again later that day.

The Germans managed to destroy 7 Polish tanks with artillery, but just after, they lost five of their Panzer tanks. After receiving several more direct hits and losing two more large Panzer tanks, the German tank crews simply ran away. Polish 7TP tanks pursued and kept beating the rest of the tanks off. The German soldiers now met the Polish infantry and attacked, but they were repelled by the Polish tanks.

Soon, all the Germans retreated and by the end of September 6, no hostile forces were in Piotrków Trybunalski. On September 7, Marshal Rydz-Smigly ordered the Polish forces to withdraw.

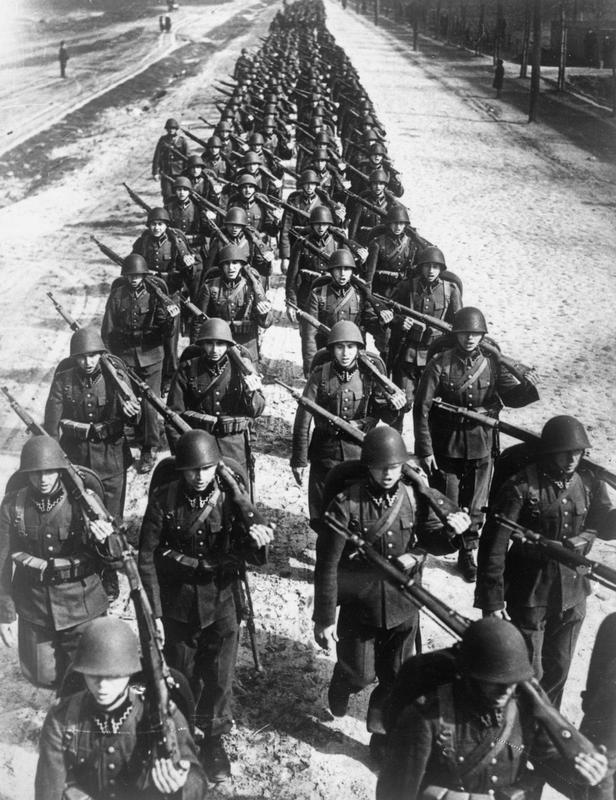
Polish Infantry column marching

The core of the Polish force consisted of most of "Prusy" Army's Northern Group. The army, created as the main operational reserve of Polish commander in chief Marshall Edward Rydz-Śmigły was also the last to be mobilised in the summer of 1939. Intended as a reserve of Łódź Army and Kraków Army, the Prusy Army was to support its neighbours and relieve them once the main German attacks are slowed down. However, the Battle of the Border did not gain the Poles enough time to fully mobilise the reserves.

While most of Polish Army had been successfully mobilised prior to 1 September 1939, on that date many sub-units of Prusy Army were still being formed or transported. By 4 September 1939, when the German forces broke through the overstretched Polish defences, the Prusy army was far from battle-ready. Its Northern Group at that date consisted of 29th Infantry Division and Wileńska Cavalry Brigade, with 19th Infantry Division still being formed in the forests to the north-east of Piotrków Trybunalski while the 13th Infantry Division was still waiting for some of its sub-units near the railway hub of Koluszki and did not become available until September 6. The army was strengthened by a mobile reserve formed by the 1st Light Tank Battalion (armed with modern 7TP tanks) stationed between Opoczno and Końskie, and the 81st Motorised Sappers Battalion.

Apart from units of the Prusy Army, the Polish side also included a number of smaller units from Łódź Army. In the city of Piotrków Trybunalski itself the 146th Infantry Regiment was being mobilised for the 44th Reserve Infantry Division and was dispatched to the front as part of an improvised battle group under Col. Ludwik Czyżewski. In addition, elements of the Wołyńska Cavalry Brigade and the 2nd Legions' Infantry Regiment of the 2nd Legions Infantry Division also took part in the battle as part of Col. Czyżewski's group.

It is unclear how many of the new Polish 9TP tanks were actually produced, although it appears at least 11 9TP tanks were delivered and used by the Polish Army at the start of hostilities as most Polish forces had the 7TP. The 11 tanks could have been either standard 7TP or 7TP with some of the modifications included, but not all of them. The tanks of this batch were incorporated in the 2nd Light Tank Company and took part in the fights during the Siege of Warsaw and served with distinction until the capitulation of the city on 27 September 1939.

In September 1939, Polish Army had only 136 7TPs (24 dw, 97 jw and 11 jw produced in September 1939 along with 4 prototypes made of regular plate), which equipped two Polish light tank battalions (each with 49 tanks) and other units. During Polish Campaign, Polish 7TP Light Tank units put up a valiant defense against the invading German Army in the opening phases and the 7TP proved to be a match for any German Panzer. The Poles had placed great value on the River Vistula to act as a natural barrier to any form of military advance. The Germans crossed the river on Day 5 of the attack. By this time, the Polish air force had been defeated and this had stripped the Polish Army of any form of air cover – it also meant that the Polish tanks and army were easy targets for the Luftwaffe which was free to operate in Poland after September 2. When the Russians invaded eastern Poland on September 17, the defeat of Poland was sealed. On September 24, Warsaw was bombed by 1,150 German aircraft.

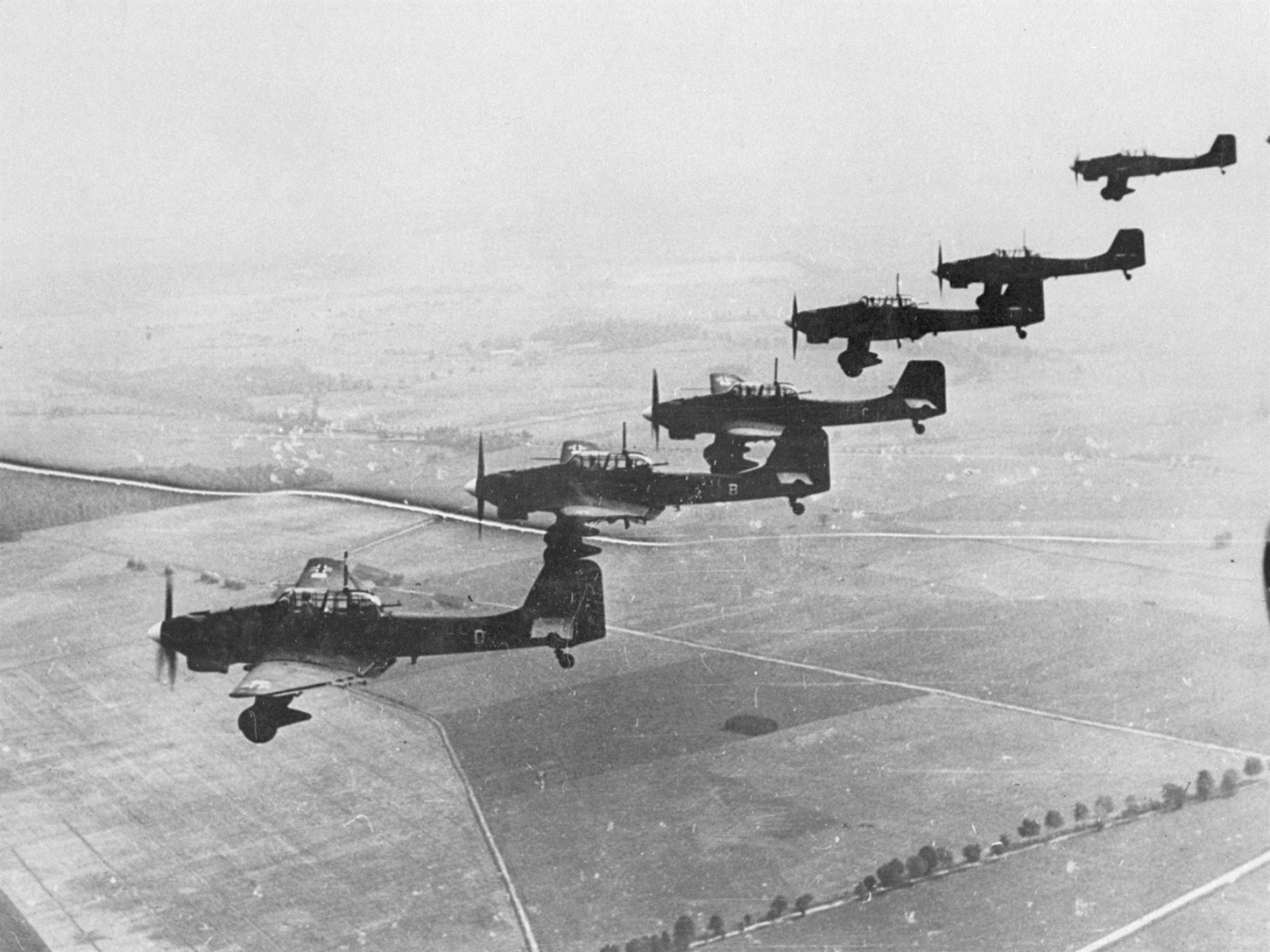
Ju 87 Bs Stukas over Poland, September 1939

Ironically, many point to the impact of German tanks during the campaign. Yet it is known that many of the tanks used during the attack were equipped only with machine guns or small calibre guns rather than cannons as compared to later tank designs. What did the damage was the constant onslaught of all parts of the blitzkrieg, including large numbers of tanks, that never allowed the Polish Army to gather its breath and re-group. Complete air superiority gave the Germans every opportunity to attack the retreating Polish forces and destroy their tanks. The Ju 87 Stukas were a constant threat to the Polish tanks and forces, and six Polish divisions trapped by encircling German forces were forced to surrender after a relentless four-day bombardment.

On September 27, Warsaw surrendered. The Polish military put up a brave fight, but they were the first army to feel the full might of the German Blitzkrieg, the same tactic that was to push the British and French armies back to Dunkirk in 1940. In Poland, tanks versus a primarily non-mechanised army could only lead to one result.

The campaign against Poland ended on 6 October 1939 with Germany and the Soviet Union dividing and annexing the whole of Poland. Some captured 7TPs were painted in Panzergrau with German markings and were presented during the victory parade in Warsaw on October 8, 1939.

== The Polish 2nd Armored Regiment in France ==
After the September 1939 defeat, the Polish Army was re-created in France. The armoured units were created there as well (the 10th Armoured-Motorized Brigade of Col. S. Maczek). The first training tanks, however - 42 FTs - were given to the Poles only in March 1940. Many of them were not armed at all, some were armed with 7.5mm Mle.31 MG, only few had 37mm SA-18 guns. Only in May 1940, the first battalion of the 10th Brigade was given the new tanks Renault R-35 and sent to the front in a hurry. After that, the 2nd battalion was equipped with Renault/AMX R-40 tanks and sent to the front.

Poland also raised the 2nd Polish Armoured Regiment in France on 29 January 1940 as the 2nd Tank Battalion and fought under this title in the French campaign of 1940. Members of the regiment reformed in Scotland on 13 November 1942 after the fall of France adopting the designation of 2nd Armoured Regiment. The reconstituted unit returned to France in late July 1944 as a part of the 10th Armoured Cavalry Brigade, 1st (Polish) Armoured Division.

== Formation of Polish Armoured Forces in Soviet Union ==
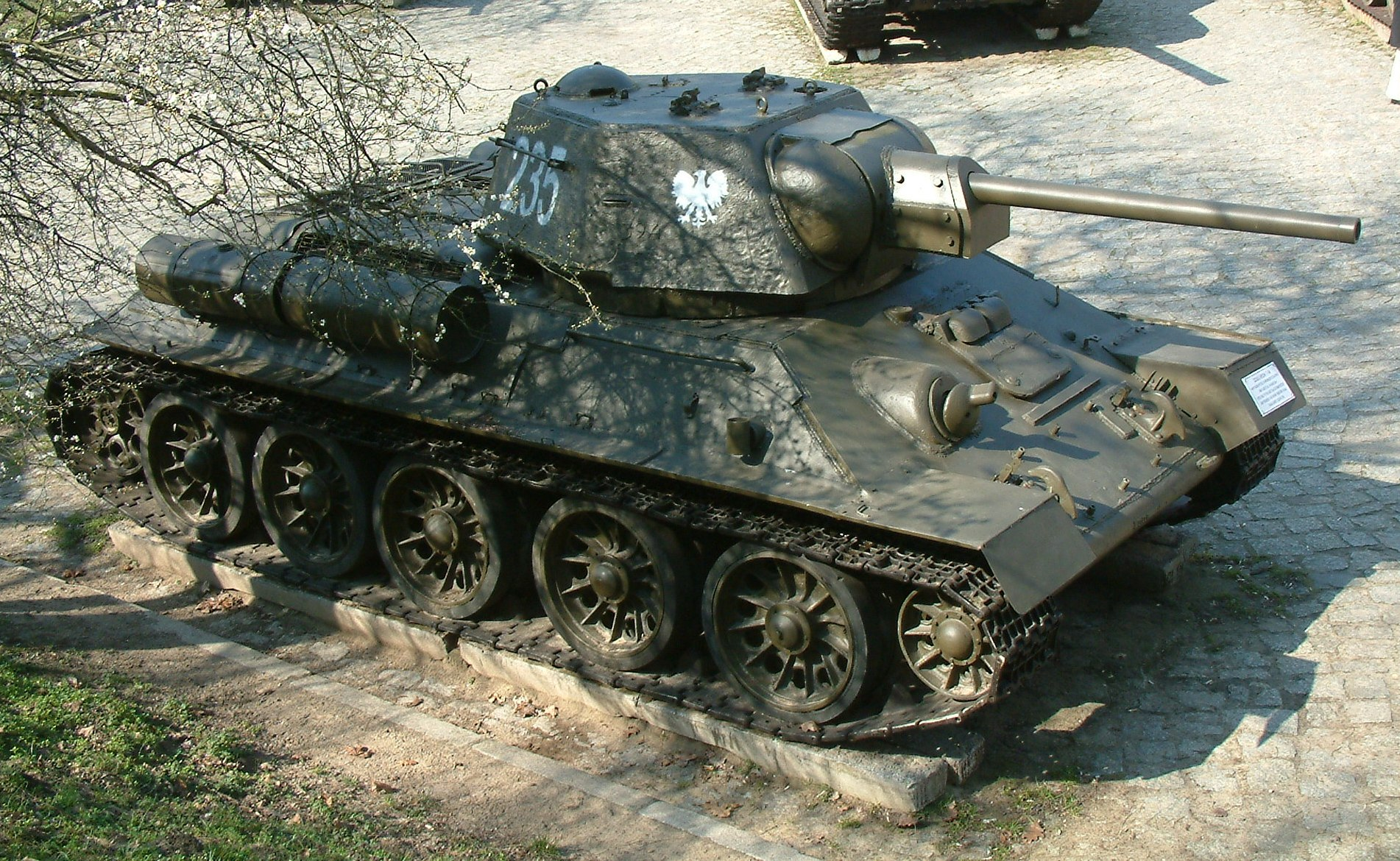
Polish T-34 Model 1942 in Poznań, Poland. The model 1942's hexagonal turret distinguishes it from earlier models.

At the outbreak of World War Two in September 1939, the Soviet Union and Nazi Germany divided Poland in a twin invasion agreed in the Molotov-Ribbentrop Pact. About 200,000 soldiers of the Polish army who were in the newly occupied territory were taken prisoner by the Red Army. Diplomatic relations between the Soviet Union and Poland were re-established when Nazi Germany reneged on its pact with its erstwhile ally, the Soviet Union, and attacked it on 22 June 1941 in Operation Barbarossa. An agreement between Stalin, Churchill, Eden and the Polish government-in-exile in London led by General Sikorski was signed on 30 July 1941 whereby all Poles held by the Soviet Union were to be freed so as to form an army to help the fight against Hitler. Stalin also agreed that this military force would be subordinate to the Polish government-in-exile based in London. The Polish military leader in exile, General Sikorski, named General Władysław Anders as commander of the new army. The Polish forces reorganized in the Soviet Union in March 1942 and the name Anders' Army was the informal yet common name of the Polish Armed Forces in the East in the period 1941–42, in recognition of its commander Władysław Anders.

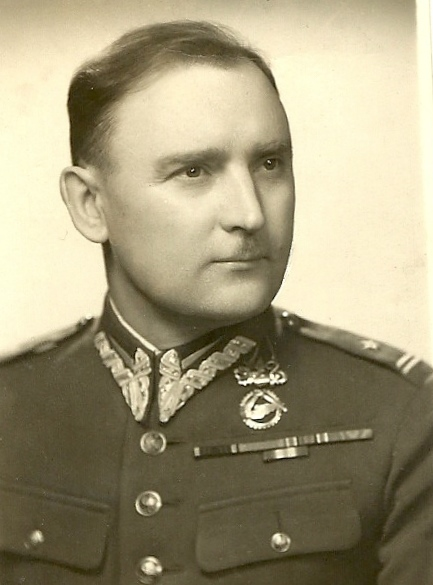
Major Stanislaw Szostak

On 20 September 1941 Major Szostak, Commander of the Polish Armoured Forces in the Soviet Union submitted a wide ranging training plan for the Polish Units by proposing to create a training centre of tank and transport troops to be attached to the Soviet Tank Training School in Saratov. The plan was approved by Gen Anders and submitted to the Soviet authorities in Moscow. Their agreement was never received. Then Major Szostak, on his own initiative, approached Col Rogonin commanding officer of the Saratov Tank School with a plan to train Polish units which were being formed, on the School equipment. Col Rogonin favoured the plan but its approval was never received from the Ulianovsk Military District. At the beginning of January 1942 Gen Anders ordered further enlargement of the Polish Forces in the Soviet Union. At the same time the army command started making plans to adopt British army structure and Major Szostak, on 15 Jan 1942 ordered the formation of the following units:

1. Organisation Centre of Tank Units - c.o. Capt Bronislaw Rafalski
2. Tank Training Centre - c.o. Major Felsztynski (Order 150/tjn. Br.Panc.)

The core of the Tank Training Centre was to consist of the 5th and the 6th Tank Battalions. At the beginning the Centre was located in the region of Carabalty in the vicinity of Frunze. The training started on 15 Feb. 1942. In the second half of 1942, during the big German offensive in the Caucasus, Stalin agreed that the Polish formation could be used on the Middle Eastern front in Persia (Iran). Towards the end of March troops were evacuated to Iran and he "Anders Army" was transferred from Krasnovodsk across the Caspian Sea to the port of Pahlavi (today Bandar-e Anzali) and a makeshift city comprising over 2000 tents (provided by the Iranian army) was hastily erected along the shoreline of Pahlavi to accommodate them.

== The Polish II Corps ==
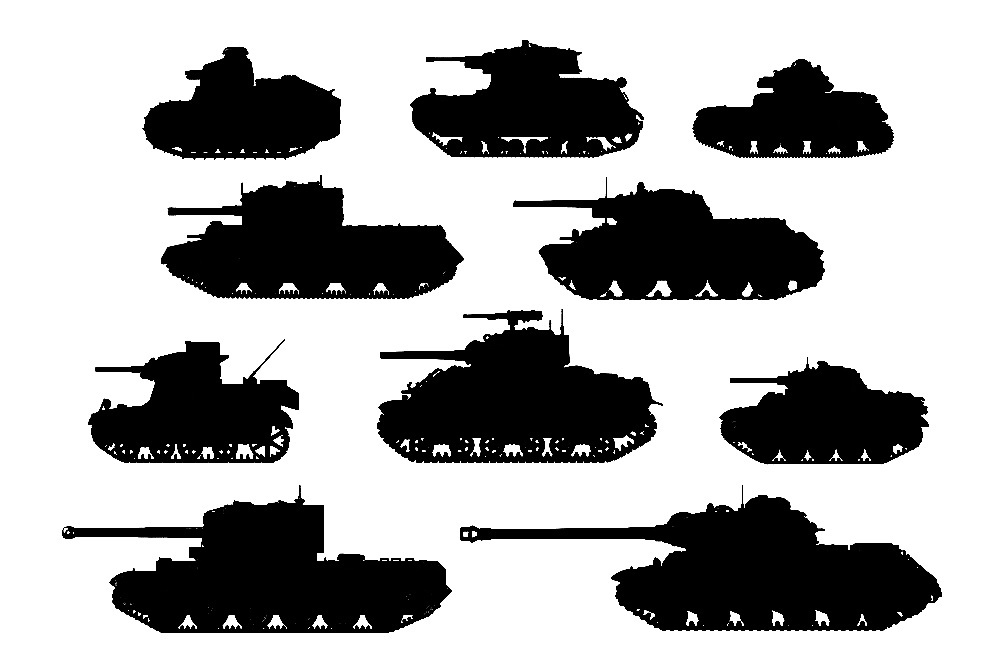
all tanks operated in combat by Polish forces during WW2

After their arrival in Persia, more men were added via the overland route from Ashkhabad in Uzbekistan to the railhead at Mashhad in Persia. The "Anders Army" thus passed from Soviet control to British control. It was renamed the Polish Second Corps and joined the Polish Armed Forces in the West. They made its way through Iran to Palestine where the Jewish Poles left and joined Jewish veteran settlements there.(These Jewish soldiers was dubbed the "Anders Aliyah" and played an important role in the founding of the State of Israel in 1948.)

After the evacuation to the Middle East, Gen. Anders ordered re-organisation of the army. On 4 April 1942 he ordered formation of the 2nd Tank Brigade. Gen. Paszkiewicz (c.o. of the brigade) outlined structure of the brigade and appointed commanding officers. Initially Tank Training Centre was attached to the brigade but later became a part of the Army Training Centre under a name of Transport and Tank Training Centre commanded by Major Szostak. The units in Palestine were formed into a new Carpathian Division incorporating the former Polish Carpathian Brigade ("the rats of Tobruk") who had just been moved to Palestine after successful defense of Tobruk in Libya alongside the Australians.

Initially there was a shortage of the training equipment and even some light Italian tanks had to be transported to the Centre from the battlefields of North Africa. Training was progressing slowly due to the heat. On October 19, 1943 a full quota of Sherman tanks was received to train units of the 2nd Tank Brigade. The entire training of the tank units of the 2nd Polish Corps was conducted by the Centre, commanded by Lt.Col. Szostak. In March 1944 the Centre was stationed in St. Basilio and Metra in Italy and became part of the Reserve Armoured Troops Centre of the 2nd Polish Corps (Gen Anders order dated 15 April 1944). Some soldiers volunteered to supplement the Polish Armoured Corps in England, and were sent to Britain to fight in Europe. The 2nd Corps itself took part in the Mediterranean campaign with the British 8th Army and fought in Italy including Monte Cassino. On 6 August 1944 the Centre became known as the 7th Armoured Regiment.

== The Polish 1st Armoured Division in the United Kingdom ==
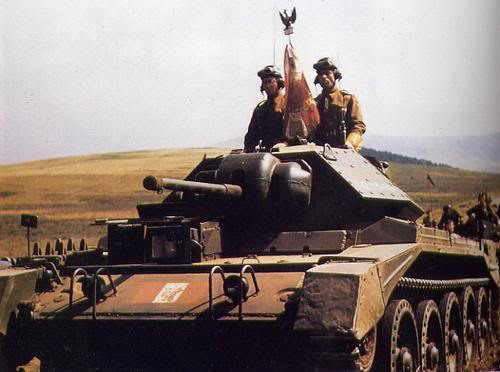
Crusader tank of Polish 1st Armoured Division near Haddington 1943

The Polish 1st Armoured Division (Polish 1 Dywizja Pancerna) was an Allied military unit during World War II, created in February 1942 at Duns in Scotland. At its peak it numbered approximately 16,000 soldiers. It was commanded by General Stanisław Maczek. The division was formed as part of the I Polish Corps. In the early stages the division was stationed in Scotland and guarded approximately 200 kilometres of British coast. In the UK, it participated in war games together with the 4th Canadian (Armoured) Division. When the 1st Armoured had been transferred to Normandy and in later fighting in France, the Low Countries and Germany, the Poles and Canadians followed very close paths. Its final elements arrived on August 1 and the unit was attached to the First Canadian Army and it joined combat during Operation Totalize and fought in one of the first memorable actions in Normandy, one fought at Saint-Aignan on 8 August 1944. The division twice suffered serious casualties from Allied aircraft which accidentally bombed friendly troops, but yet it achieved a victory against the Wehrmacht in the battles for Mont Ormel, and the town of Chambois.

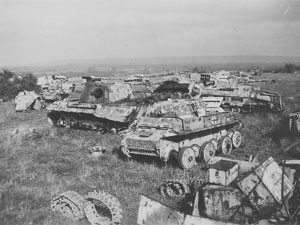
German equipment destroyed in the Falaise operation.

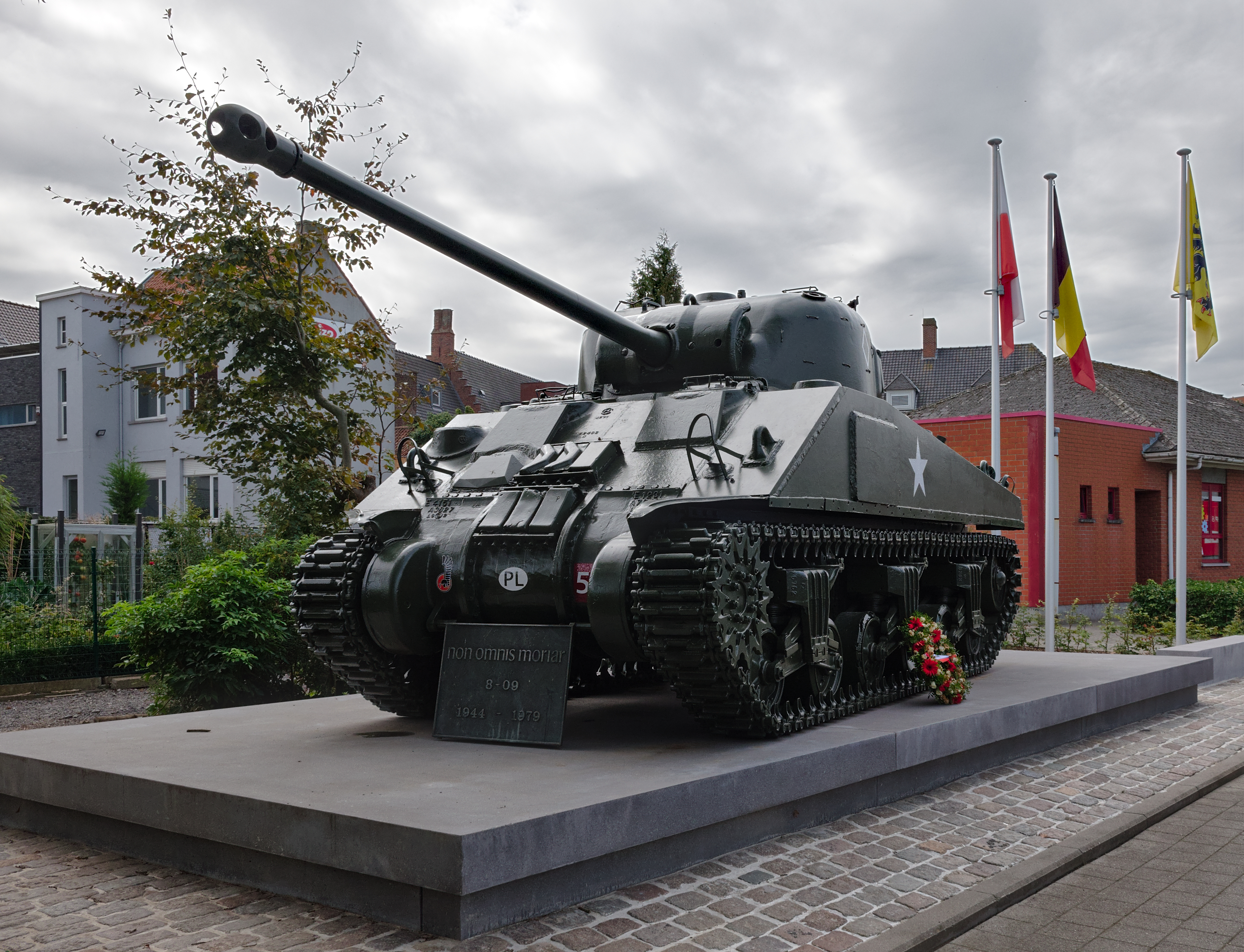
Polish Sherman Firefly monument.

This series of offensive and defensive operations came to be known as the Battle of Falaise in which a large number of German army and SS divisions were trapped in the Falaise pocket and subsequently destroyed. Maczek's division had the crucial role of closing the pocket at the escape route of those German divisions, hence the fighting was absolutely desperate and the 2nd Polish Armoured Regiment, 24th Polish Lancers and 10th Dragoons supported by the 8th and 9th Infantry Battalions took the brunt of German attacks trying to break free from the pocket. Surrounded and running out of ammunition they withstood incessant attacks from multiple fleeing panzer divisions for 48 hours until they were relieved.

Following the Normandy campaign the unit saw action in Belgium, the Netherlands and in April 1945 the 1st Armoured entered Germany in the area of Emsland. On May 6 the division seized the Kriegsmarine naval base in Wilhelmshaven, where General Maczek accepted the capitulation of the fortress, naval base, East Frisian Fleet and more than 10 infantry divisions. There the Division ended the war and was joined by the Polish 1st Independent Parachute Brigade. The cease-fire in May 1945 found them in northwestern Germany.

== Tanks in the Polish People's Army ==
The Ludowe Wojsko Polskie ([luˈdɔvɛ ˈvɔi̯skɔ ˈpɔlskʲɛ]; lit: Polish People's Army) was the second formation of the Polish Armed Forces in the East (1943–1945) . What later became the LWP was formed during the Second World War as the Polish 1st Tadeusz Kościuszko Infantry Division, also unofficially known as the Berling Army. As late as the beginning of 1945, out of approximately 40 thousand officers, the LWP had almost half, or 18,996, Soviet officers, including 36 generals.

The LWP Polish formation fought along the Allied side in the USSR, after the Anders Army had left the USSR. The LWP Polish forces soon grew beyond the 1st Division into two major commands - the Polish First Army (Berling's) and the Polish Second Army (commanded by Karol Świerczewski). The most significant tank formation in the initial period was the 1st Warsaw Armoured Brigade equipped with T-34 tanks, that first fought in the battle of Studzianki.

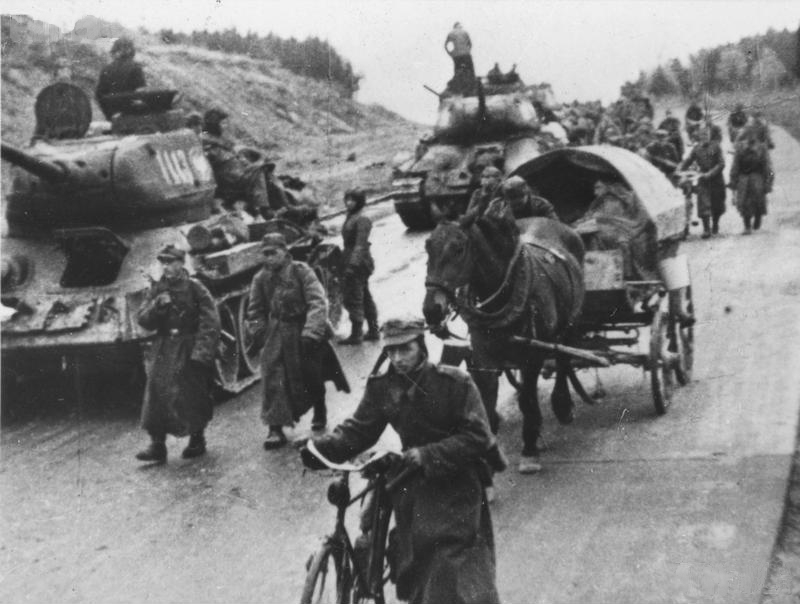
Tanks of Polish First Army on their way to Berlin, 1945

The Polish First Army participated in the Vistula–Oder Offensive and the Battle of Kolberg (1945) before participating in its final offensive with the Battle of Berlin, and later became the armed force of the Polish communist government of Poland after the German surrender. The Polish Second Army entered combat in 1945 during the final Soviet offensive into Germany. In the last month of the war the 1st Polish Armoured Corps equipped with 195 T-34-85 tanks fought in eastern Germany during the battle of Bautzen.

The primary tank was the T-34, both in the T-34-76 and T-34-85 versions. IS-2 heavy tanks equipped two heavy tank regiments that participated in combat, each with 21 tanks. Also used were the T-70 light tanks (In period between July 1943 to January 1945, Polish units in the east (Ludowe Wojsko Polskie) used 53 T-70s. Polish lost 12 T-70s in combat. T-70s were used mainly in 1st Polish Tank Regiment (Pierwszy Pułk Czolgów), the 3rd Training Tank Regiment (Trzeci Szkolny Pułk Czołgów) and at least one in 27th Regiment of Self-propelled Altillery (Dwudziesty siódmy Pułk Artylerii Samobieżnej). The Polish High Officers Tank School had 18 units.

=== Post-war ===
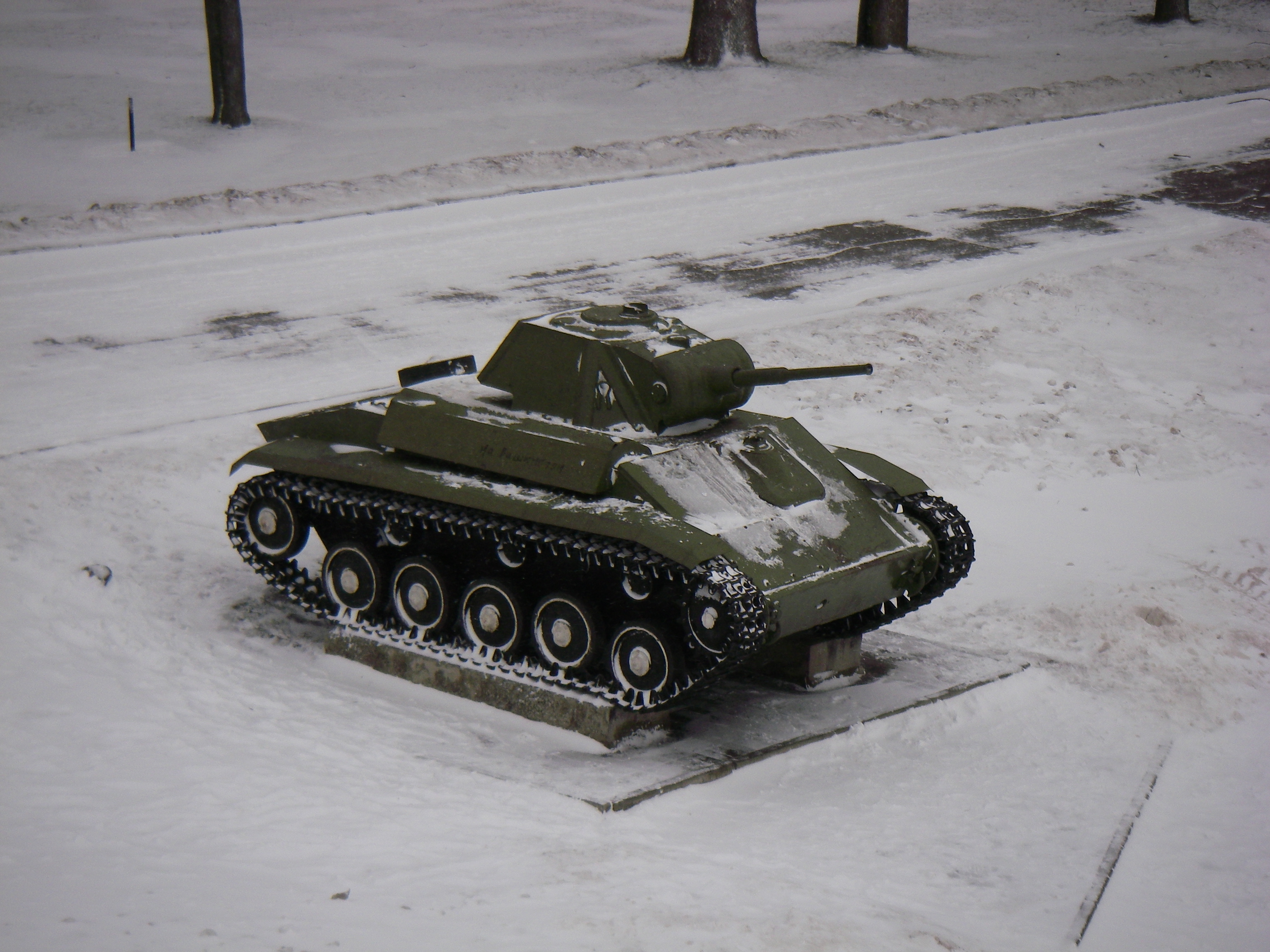
A T-70 light tank

After World War II, Polish T-70s were used in combat against the Ukrainian Insurgent Army (nationalists) units in years 1945-1947. A T-70 was found in the Bieszczady forest and restored. It is now exhibited in Armoured Warfare Museum in Poznań, in running condition since 2013.

After the war, the Polish Army was reorganized into six (later seven) military districts. These were the Warsaw Military District, headquarters (HQ) in Warsaw, the Lublin Military District, HQ in Lublin, the Kraków Military District, HQ in Kraków, the Lodz Military District, HQ in Lodz, the Poznan Military District, HQ in Poznan, the Pomeranian Military District, HQ in Torun, and the Silesian Military District, HQ in Katowice, created in autumn 1945.

== Cold War ==
With massive quantities of weapons and tanks from World War II, the Soviet Union was able to help build the armoured forces of the satellite states within its sphere of influence quickly and the Polish Armoured Forces received some of these.

In the late 1940s and early 1950s, the Polish Army was under the command of Marshal of the Soviet Union Konstantin Rokossovsky, who was given the additional title Marshal of Poland and was also Minister of National Defense. It was increasingly tied into the Soviet structures however this process was stopped in the aftermath of the Polish October in 1956.

The LWP also took part in the suppressing of the 1968 democratization process of Czechoslovakia, commonly known as Prague Spring. As the operation against Czechoslovakia, columns of tanks and motorized rifle troops of the LWP headed toward Prague and other major centers, meeting no resistance. The 28,000 troops of the Polish 2nd Army from the Silesian Military District, commanded by general Florian Siwicki, were the main Polish force.

In the late 1980s, the Polish Army modernized all of its obsolete T-55 tanks to the T-55AM Mérida standard. The successful conversion convinced the General Staff that similar modernization could also be applied to other Soviet-designed tanks made in Poland and used by the Polish Armed Forces. In late 1988 it was decided to prepare a project of modernization for the T-72M1 design - using the experience from production of licensed T-72M (obiekt 172M-E3 - Polish army designation T-72), T-72M1 (obiekt 172M-E5), T-72M1K (Polish army designation T-72M1D).

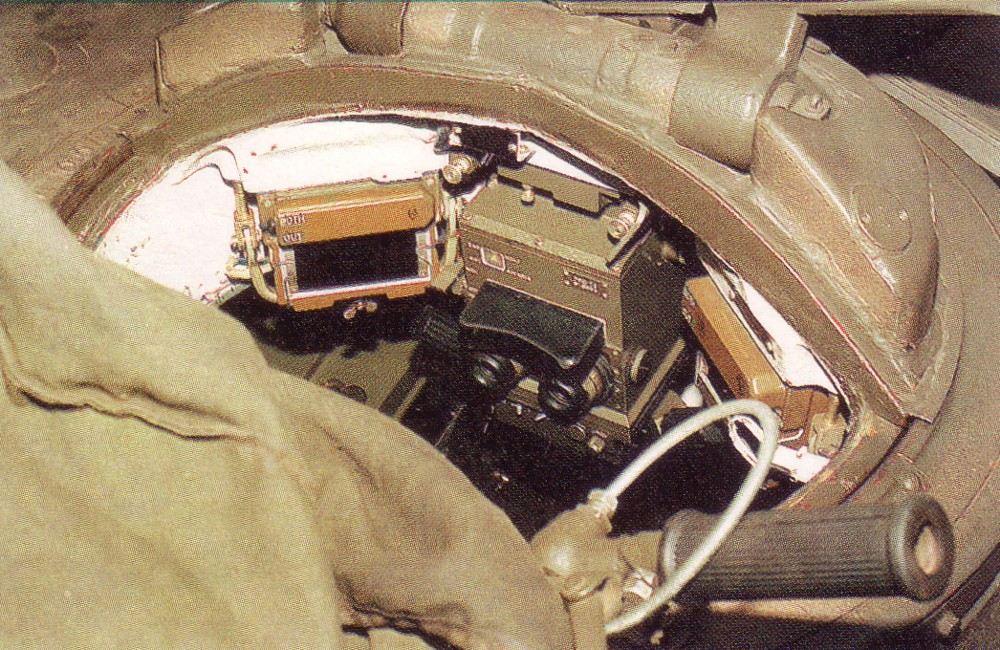
POD-72 commanders sight

The Gliwice-based Research and Development Centre of Mechanical Systems OBRUM (Polish: Ośrodek Badawczo-Rozwojowy Urządzeń Mechanicznych) was chosen as the main design bureau. However, initially the work progressed at a very slow pace, mainly because the Polish General Staff was also considering the purchase of a newer version of T-72 (T-72S) or the modern T-80.

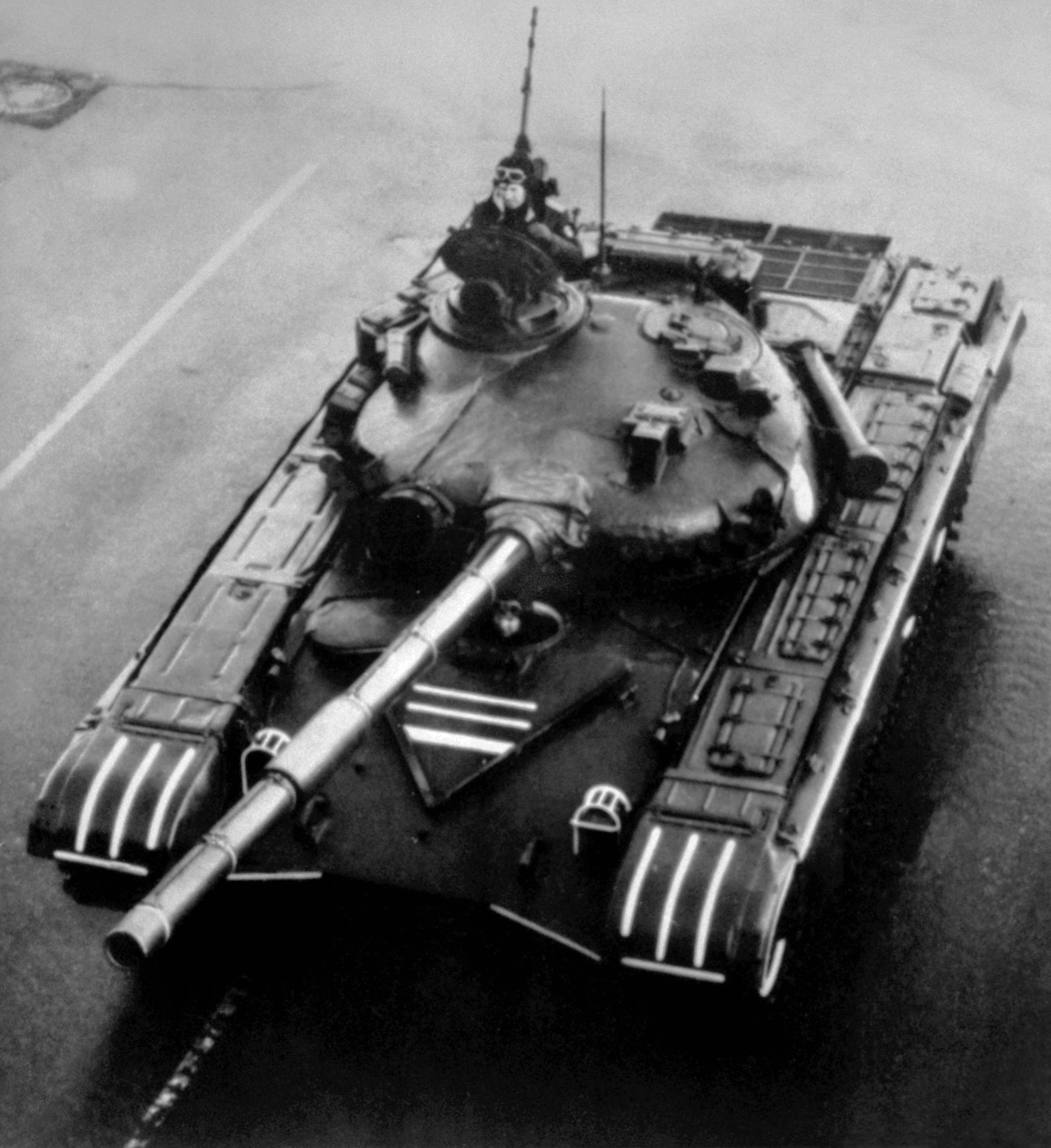
A T-72 tank with composite armour on the turret front.

After the political changes of 1989 and the dissolution of the Soviet bloc, Polish-Soviet talks on purchase of modern tanks came to a halt and the design of a new Polish tank gained momentum. The first design proposed by the bureau was code-named Wilk (Polish for wolf), but the project was cancelled. Instead, the priority was shifted to a different project named Twardy. The basic aim of the conversion of T-72 was to adapt it to the reality of modern warfare and fix its most visible deficiencies. Among those were low mobility, insufficient armour, lack of a fire control system and poor stabilisation of the main gun, which resulted in poor firing accuracy, and additional problem of lack of passive night vision aiming systems.

Starting from July 1991 T-72 modernization programs were implemented by the Bumarcombine which had been producing T-72s under Soviet license. The modernized main battle tank was designated PT-91 Twardy. In 1993 the Polish Defense Ministry ordered 20 PT-91 tanks to be used for field trials and Armed Forces tests.

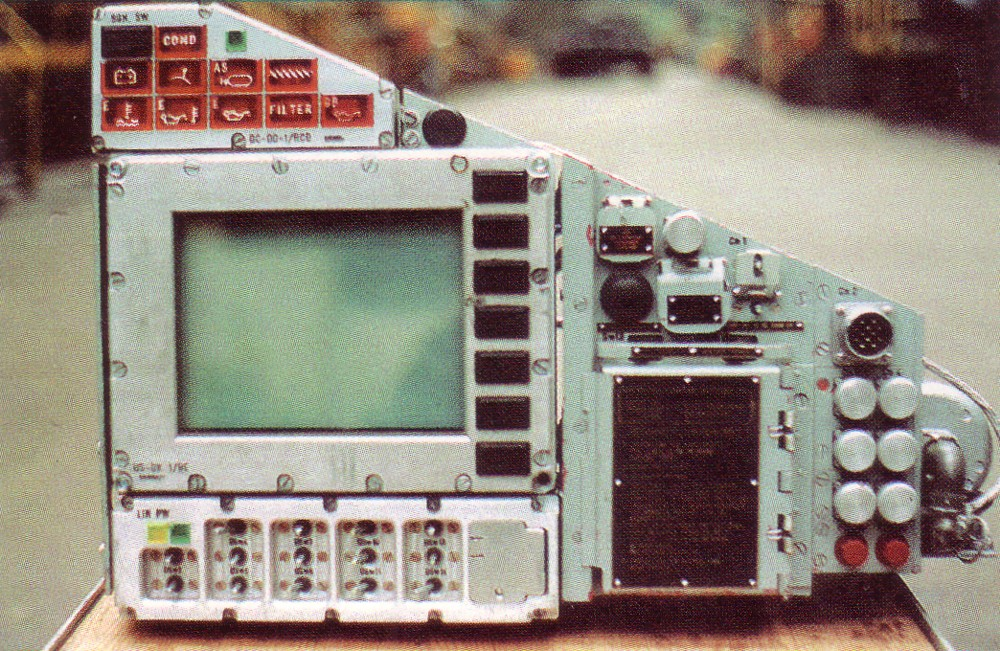
Driver's control panel US-DK-1

The main battle tank's protection from high-explosive anti-tank (HEAT) projectiles and missiles was increased by new Erawa dynamic armor developed by the Poland Military-Technical Institute which consists of 394 tiles with explosives, detonating in case of a direct hit. The Twardy used steel anti-HEAT screens instead of the rubber used on the T-72. The Erawa's main difference from the Soviet analogs is that Erawa's containers fit almost without gaps while on the Soviet modernised T-72 the gaps reach 10 – 15 mm noticeably decreasing defense effectiveness.

Experiments showed that the Erawa dynamic defense decreased the high-explosive jet impact depth by 50 - 70% and penetrator (APFSDS) projectiles by 30 - 40%. Furthermore, explosive containers do not detonate when hit by shot of up to 30 mm calibre, shell or mine fragments, or when covered in burning napalm or petrol.

The Twardy was armed with the same 125 mm smoothbore gun 2A46 used in the T-72, fitted with an automatic reloading mechanism which reduced the tank crew by one as it replaced the gun loader, and gave a rate of fire of eight to ten rounds per minute. The modernization of the fire control system started by replacing the earlier used Soviet two plane stabilizer 2Є28M with a new stabilizer developed in Slovakia. It incorporated an electronic information block showing the tank's technical condition and informs the commander when effective sighted fire becomes ineffective because of an excessively high cross-country speed or other reasons.

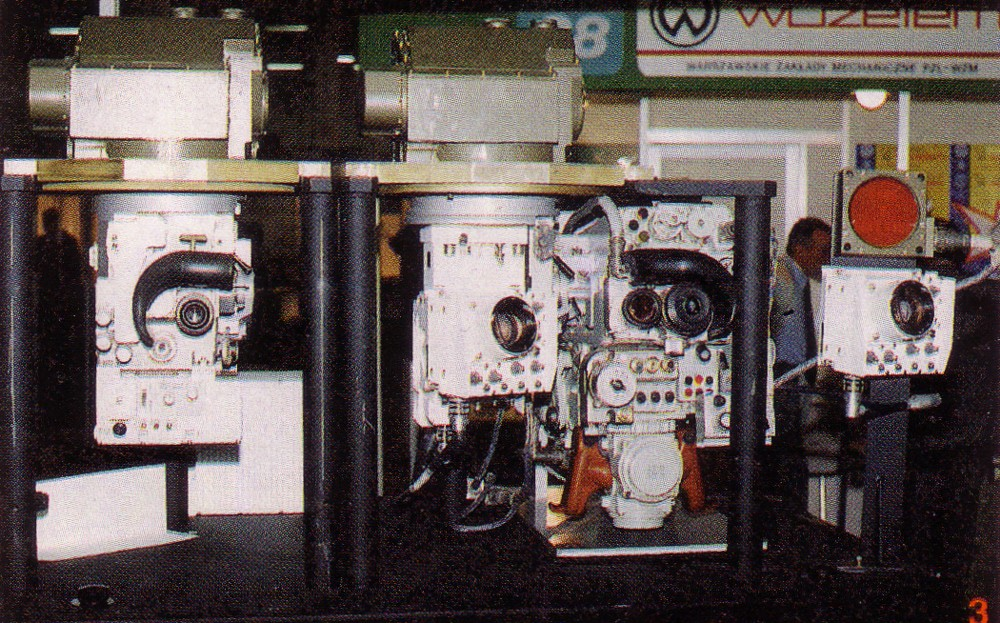
Drawa fire control system

The Drawa fire control system, developed by Polish engineers, contains the gunner's day sight PCD and the TES thermovision night sight developed by the Israeli company ELOP, the commander's combined day-night passive observation and aiming sight POD-72, a ballistic computer, a laser rangefinder and a data system processing information for the ballistic computer. The sighting of the ballistic computer depends on the target's speed, weather conditions, projectile temperature and projectile type. The driver would use the control and diagnostic complex US-DK-1 controlling the tank's main systems and displaying information on a monitor. The driver's night sight was replaced by the Radomka passive night sight.

The modernized tank's increased weight led the developers to add a more powerful engine, a 12-cylinder S-12U diesel engine, a modernized version of the Soviet V-46-6 produced in Warsaw by PZL-Wola (850 hp instead of 780). The main improvement was the modernized fuel and air injection system. This caused a noticeable decrease in the tank's road endurance. The latest Twardy variants have the 1000 hp S-1000 engine with a turbocharger.

== Leopard tanks from Germany ==
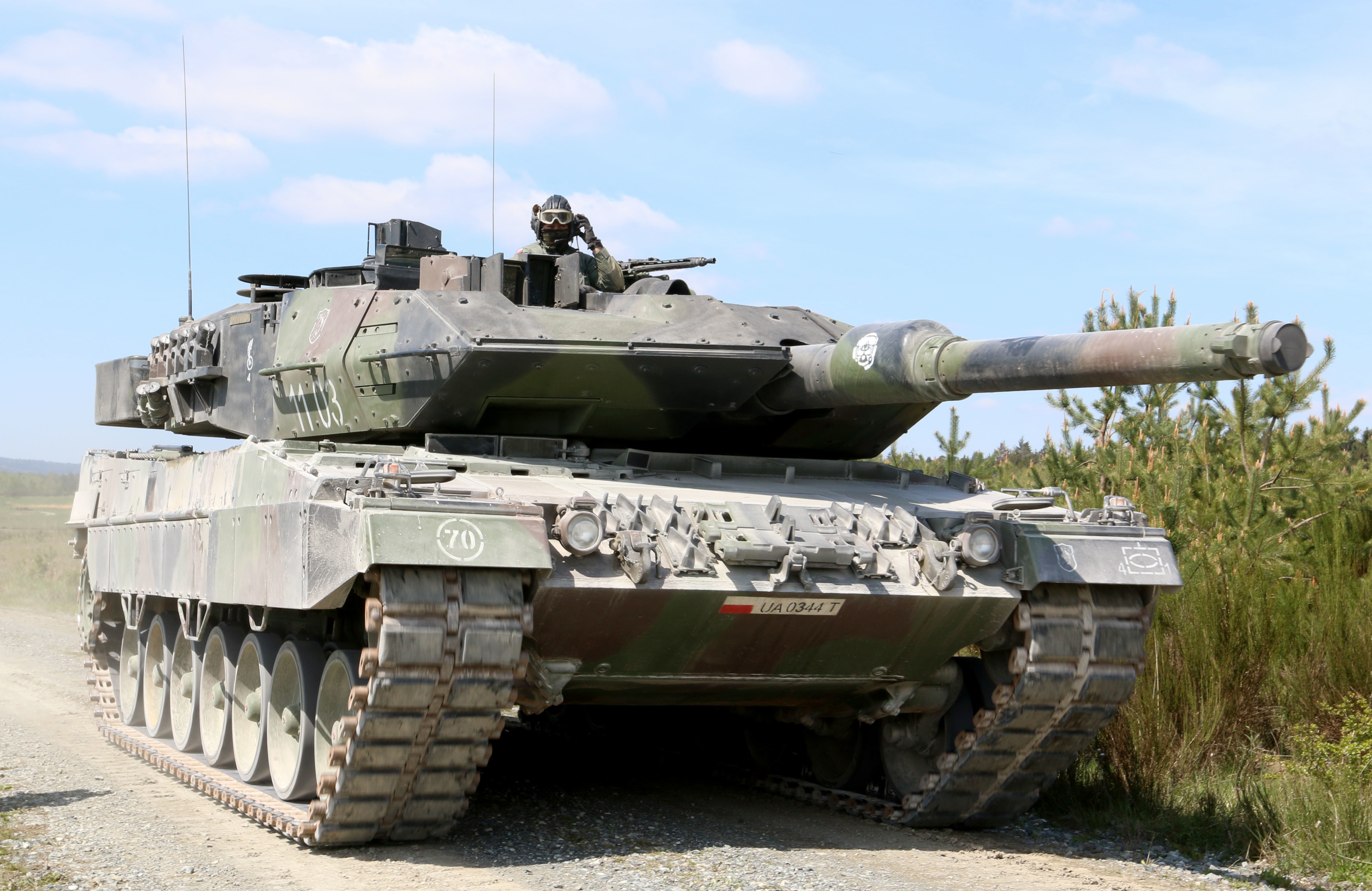
Leopard 2A5 of the Polish Land Forces, 2017

In November 2013 Polish Defense Ministry acquired 119 tanks from the German Army. These include 105 Leopard 2A5 tanks and 14 2A4 variants, and stated they want the Leopard to be the main tank operated by the Polish Army.

"The version which we are acquiring will remain operational for many years to come without the need to be modernized," a Polish Defense Ministry official said. Deliveries are scheduled from 2014 to 2015. The contract is worth €180 million (US $243 million), according to the Polish MoD. The procurement also covers related military equipment, including transportation vehicles, machine guns, training and radio location systems. In 2003 Poland obtained 128 of these Leopard tanks from Germany for the bargain basement price of $21.6 million along with 23 MiG-29 fighters for only $30 million. The tanks were selected by Polish tank experts from among the three hundred Leopard 2s recently placed in storage after being taken out of service by the downsized German Army. The original 128 Leopards still had at least 75 percent of their operational life remaining. That deal included 8 Buffel armored recovery vehicles, four Biber bridgelayers, four Keiler mine-clearing tanks, and ten M577 command post vehicles. The Polish military is aiming to overhaul these 128 Leopard 2A4 tanks it already operates.

== Abrams tanks from United States ==
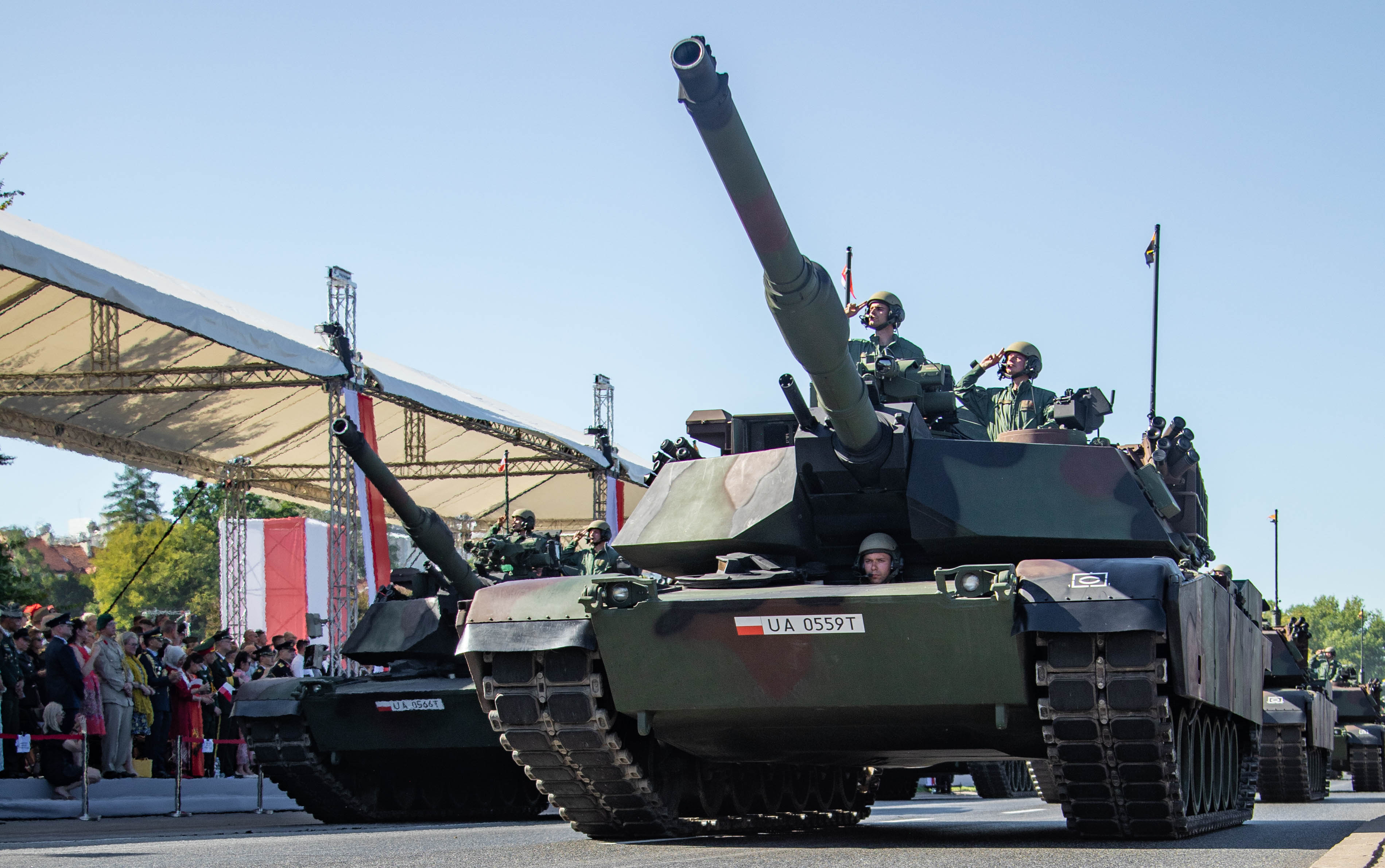
Polish M1 Abrams Tanks.

Poland ordered a total of 116 M1A1 and 250 M1A2 Abrams tanks adapted to the requirements of the Polish Armed Forces in January 2022. Poland received the first company of 14 M1A1 Abrams tanks which is one part of the deal worth $1.4 billion for 116 M1A1 FEP Abrams tanks at the Port of Szczecin on 28 June 2023. Deliveries are scheduled to be completed by the end of 2024. The M1A1 tanks will allow Warsaw to replace the T-72 and PT-91 tanks it sent to Ukraine for its war with Russia, and will join the Leopard 2A4 and Leopard 2A5 tanks acquired from Germany. The second part of the deal, is an additional 250 Abrams of the M1A2 SEPv3 variant, to be delivered in 2025 and 2026.

== K-2 Black Panther tanks from South Korea ==
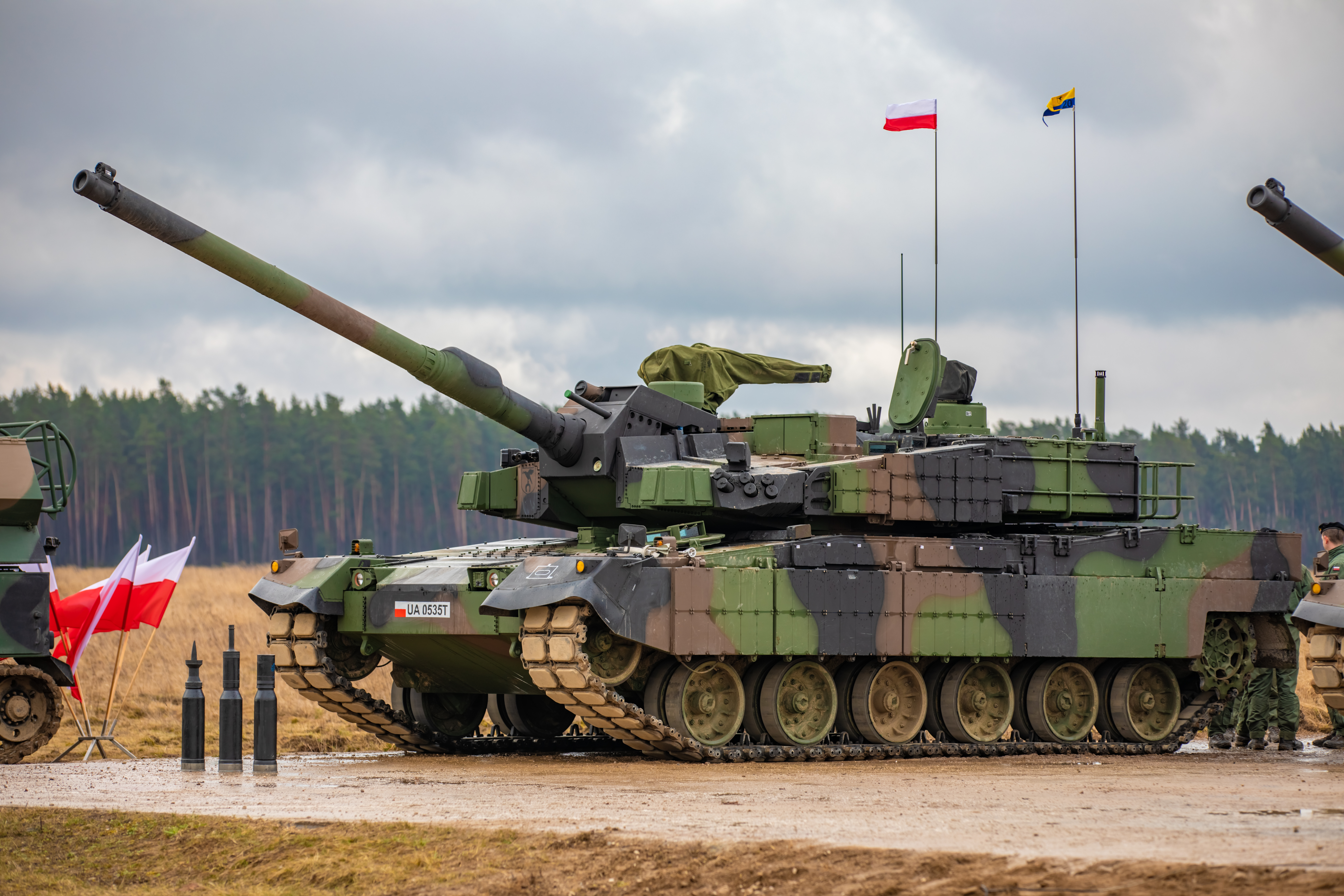
A Polish K2 Black Panther

Twenty-eight K-2 tanks were delivered to Poland in 2023 from South Korea in fulfilment of an order agreed to in 2022 to deliver a total of 180 K-2 tanks to the Polish Armed Forces. Poland then signed a $14.5 billion arms deal in March 2023 for potentially a total of 1,000 South Korean-designed K-2 Black Panther main battle tanks. The contract with the Republic of Korea provides for the production of main battle tanks in Poland which will be designated K2PL. The launch of localized production is scheduled for 2026. In December 2022, 180 Hyundai K2 Black Panther tanks began arriving in Poland pulled from ROK Army units for rapid delivery, as this was important as Poland did not want a potential prolonged wait for German Leopard 2's. In the deal, Poland plans to domestically manufacture the remaining 820, which will join the US Abrams M1A1 tanks that Poland had also ordered to transform Poland's military as it builds up its armored forces in the wake of Russia's invasion of Ukraine. In late March 2023, the Polish Army held live fire exercises to train on the South Korean-built K-2 Black Panther tanks.

== Overview per tank used by Polish Armoured Forces ==
=== Light tanks ===
- Renault FT light tank (Poland used 174 FT light tanks in different versions: char canon, char mitrailleuse, char signal, NC-1 and M 26/27)
- Renault FT CWS light tank (based on Renault FT light tank)
- 4TP light tank (Also known as PZInż.140 light tank) (only one prototype built)
- Renault Char léger Modèle 1935 R light Infantry tank (Poland used 50 of those tanks)
- Hotchkiss Char léger modèle 1935 H (Three Hotchkiss Char léger modèle 1935 H tanks had been exported to Poland in July 1939 for testing by the Polish Bureau of Technical Studies of Armoured Weapons (pl. Biuro Badań Technicznych Broni Pancernych). During the Invasion of Poland in 1939 the Hotchkiss Char léger modèle 1935 H tanks together with 3 Renault Char léger Modèle 1935 R tanks were incorporated into an ad hoc "half company" unit of lieutenant J.Jakubowicz formed on 14 September 1939 in Kiwerce, Poland. The unit joined the task force "Dubno" and lost all of its tanks during the marches and fighting with German and Soviet armies and Ukrainian insurgents.)
- Vickers 6-Ton Type A light tank (also known as Vickers Mark E) (Polish army used 38 of these tanks since 1932 with small improvements: 22 Type B and 16 Type A tanks)
- 7TP dw light tank (based on Vickers 6-Ton light tank (also known as Vickers Mark E light tank))
- 7TP jw light tank (based on Vickers 6-Ton light tank (also known as Vickers Mark E light tank))
- 10TP light fast tank (Only one prototype built)
- T-70 light tank (In period between July 1943 to January 1945, Polish units in the east (Ludowe Wojsko Polskie) used 53 T-70s. Polish lost 12 T-70s in combat. T-70s were used mainly in 1st Polish Tank Regiment (Pierwszy Pułk Czolgów), the 3rd Training Tank Regiment (Trzeci Szkolny Pułk Czołgów) and at least one in 27th Regiment of Self-propelled Altillery (Dwudziesty siódmy Pułk Artylerii Samobieżnej). The Polish High Officers Tank School had 18 units. After World War II, Polish T-70s were used in combat against the Ukrainian UPA (Nationalist) units in years 1945-1947. A T-70 was found in the Bieszczady forest and restored. It is now in very good condition and on exhibition in High Officer Tank School at Poznań city.(Wyzsza Szkoła Wojsk Pancernych w Poznaniu).)

=== Medium tanks ===
- Panzerkampfwagen III Ausführung G medium tank (3 Panzerkampfwagen III Ausführung G were captured by the Carpathian Lancers in Egypt in 1941. All three were numbered consecutively 1 to 3. All vehicles were used for training only.)
- M4A4 Sherman V medium tank (The M4 Sherman was the basic tank in Polish armoured units in the West 1943-1947. The 1st Armoured Division, fighting from Falaise (France) to Wilhelmshaven (Germany) used M4A4 Sherman V and M4A4 Sherman VC Firefly and from December 1944 - M4A1(76)W Sherman IIA.)
- M4A4 Sherman VC Firefly medium tank (The M4 Sherman was the basic tank in Polish armoured units in the West 1943-1947. The 1st Armoured Division, fighting from Falaise (France) to Wilhelmshaven (Germany) used M4A4 Sherman V and M4A4 Sherman VC Firefly and from December 1944 - M4A1(76)W Sherman IIA.)
- M4A1(76)W Sherman IIA medium tank (The M4 Sherman was the basic tank in Polish armoured units in the West 1943-1947. The 1st Armoured Division, fighting from Falaise (France) to Wilhelmshaven (Germany) used M4A4 Sherman V and M4A4 Sherman VC Firefly and from December 1944 - M4A1(76)W Sherman IIA.)
- M4A2 Sherman III medium tank (The Sherman was the basic tank in Polish armoured units in the West 1943-1947. The 2nd Warsaw Armored Brigade, fighting in Italy, used M4A2 Sherman III, later also M4 Sherman I, M4 Sherman IC Firefly, M4A1 Sherman II and M4A3 (105) HVSS Sherman IVBY.)
- M4 Sherman I medium tank (The Sherman was the basic tank in Polish armoured units in the West 1943-1947. The 2nd Warsaw Armored Brigade, fighting in Italy, used M4A2 Sherman III, later also M4 Sherman I, M4 Sherman IC Firefly, M4A1 Sherman II and M4A3 (105) HVSS Sherman IVBY.)
- M4 Sherman IC Firefly medium tank (The Sherman was the basic tank in Polish armoured units in the West 1943-1947. The 2nd Warsaw Armored Brigade, fighting in Italy, used M4A2 Sherman III, later also M4 Sherman I, M4 Sherman IC Firefly, M4A1 Sherman II and M4A3 (105) HVSS Sherman IVBY.)
- M4A1 Sherman II medium tank (The Sherman was the basic tank in Polish armoured units in the West 1943-1947. The 2nd Warsaw Armored Brigade, fighting in Italy, used M4A2 Sherman III, later also M4 Sherman I, M4 Sherman IC Firefly, M4A1 Sherman II and M4A3 (105) HVSS Sherman IVBY.)
- M4A3 (105) HVSS Sherman IVBY medium tank (The Sherman was the basic tank in Polish armoured units in the West 1943-1947. The 2nd Warsaw Armored Brigade, fighting in Italy, used M4A2 Sherman III, later also M4 Sherman I, M4 Sherman IC Firefly, M4A1 Sherman II and M4A3 (105) HVSS Sherman IVBY.)
- M4A1 "Grizzly" (Though this tank is preserved at the Polish Army Museum, there is no evidence that the Polish army ever used this vehicle. The vehicle was obtained after the demise of the USSR.)
- Panzerkampfwagen IV Ausführung H medium tank (At least one Panzerkampfwagen IV Ausführung H was used by the Warsaw Tank Brigade of the 2nd Corps in Italy in 1944.)
- T-34/76 Model 1942 medium tank (Polish had 71 T-34/76 Model 1942 and T-34/76 Model 1943 medium tanks.)
- T-34/76 Model 1943 medium tank (Polish had 71 T-34/76 Model 1942 and T-34/76 Model 1943 medium tanks.)
- T-34/85 medium tank
- T-34/85M1 medium tank (Polish refurbishing program, similar to Soviet Model 1960)
- T-34/85M2 medium tank (Polish refurbishing program, similar to Soviet Model 1969)

=== Cruiser tanks ===
- Cromwell Cruiser tank (Used by Polish 1st Armoured Division (Polish 1 Dywizja Pancerna))
- Crusader Cruiser tank (Used by Polish 1st Armoured Division (Polish 1 Dywizja Pancerna))

=== Infantry tanks ===
- Mark I Matilda I (A11) Infantry tank (In the years between 1940 and 1942, Polish units used 18 Matilda I Mark I (A11) tanks. First by the 10th Brygada Kawalerii Pancernej (Armor Cavalry Brigade), which guarded a part of Scotland's beaches near Dundee and Montrose. After 1941, the Matildas were sent to training units for the teaching of mechanical techniques and driving. In 1942, the British received all the Matilda I Mark I (A11) tanks back from the Polish.)
- Mark IV Churchill (A22) Infantry tank (Used by Polish 1st Armoured Division (Polska 1 Dywizja Pancerna))

=== Heavy tanks ===
- IS-2 (also known IS-122) heavy tank (Poland used 71 of those tanks)
- IS-3 heavy tank (Polish Army received only two IS-3 tanks. These tanks were delivered in 1946. The first was used in Military Technic Academy at Warsaw (Wojskowa Akademia Techniczna), second Polish IS-3 was sent to Officers Armor School (Oficerska Szkola Wojsk Pancernych) at Poznań city. (this IS-3 is still on exhibition.))

=== Main battle tanks ===
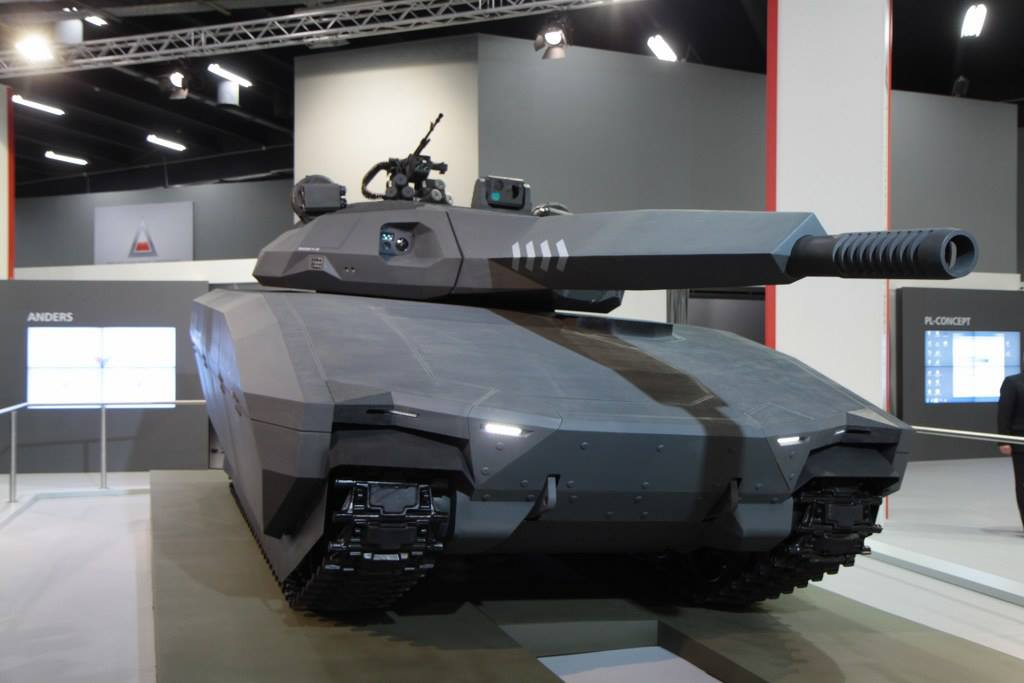
The PL-01 at the International Defence Industry Exhibition in 2013

- T-54 main battle tank
- T-55 main battle tank
- T-55A main battle tank
- T-55 AM Merida main battle tank (modernized T-55 main battle tank)
- T-55AD-2M main battle tank (modernized T-55 main battle tank, a command variant)
- T-55AMS main battle tank (modernized T-55 main battle tank)
- T-55AD-1M main battle tank (modernized T-55 main battle tank)
- T-72 main battle tank
- T-72M main battle tank
- T-72M1 main battle tank
- T-72M1D main battle tank
- T-72M1M main battle tank
- PT-91 "Twardy" main battle tank (based on T-72M1 main battle tank, 233 built)
- T-72M1Z main battle tank (T-72M1 main battle tank upgraded to PT-91 "Twardy" main battle tank standard)
- T-72M1R main battle tank (modernized T-72M and T-72M1 with new optics and communication, 230 ordered, up to 318 possible, as of end of 2021 over 50 delivered)
- PT-94 "Goryl" main battle tank (Project of a Polish main battle tank designed using experience gained on PT-91 project. The tank would be similar in its design to Merkava. This program was also known under the name Anders. The program was cancelled due to lack of funds.)
- PT-91A "Twardy" main battle tank (first proposition for export)
- PT-91Z "Twardy" main battle tank (demonstrator of export variant showed on military exhibitions)
- PT-91M "Twardy" main battle tank (production export variant for Malaysia, 48 built)
- PT-91E "Twardy" main battle tank (demonstrator of export variant showed on MSPO 2006 military exhibitions, Poland)
- Leopard 2A4 main battle tank (Poland received 128 Leopard 2A4 main battle tanks in 2002-2004 from German Army reserve stocks as military assistance, only paying for the transportation costs, additional 14 received in 2015-2016)
- Leopard 2A5 main battle tank (Poland received 105 Leopard 2A5 main battle tanks in 2015-2016 from German Army reserve stocks)
- Leopard 2PL main battle tank (modernized Leopard 2A4 main battle tank, all 128 (originally 142, before 14 were gifted to Ukraine) are being modernized, as of January 2024, 62 delivered)
- M1A1 FEP Abrams main battle tank (116 ordered in 2022, deliveries started in 2023 and ended in 2024. Planned to modernize to M1A2 SEPv3 standard at later date)
- M1A2 SEPv3 Abrams main battle tank (250 ordered in April 2022, to be delivered 2025-2026)
- K2 Black Panther 180 were ordered in 2022 to fill the gap left by the gift of T-72 and PT-91 to Ukraine. The first 10 units were delivered to Poland in December 2022, the rest are to be delivered in 2023-2025. This 180 was to go to the S. Korean army but they relinquished their order to Poland, subsequent new production K-2's will go to the S. Korean Army. (As of March 2024, Poland received 46 K2)
- K2PL Black Panther 820 ordered for production from 2026. (500 in Poland under license and 320 in South Korea)

== See also ==
- History of the tank
- Tanks in World War I
- List of interwar armoured fighting vehicles
- Tanks in World War II
- Tank classification
- List of military vehicles

== Bibliography ==
- A. Suchcitz, M. Wroński: Barwa Pułku 7 Pancernego- zarys monograficzny. Wydawnictwo Instytutu Tarnogórskiego. Tarnowskie Góry 2002.
- Lalak Zbigniew: Broń pancerna w PSZ 1939-1945. Pegaz-Bis: O.K. Media. Warsaw 2004. ISBN 83-922002-0-9
- Marian Żebrowski - "Zarys historii polskiej broni pancernej 1918-1947". Zarząd Zrzeszenia Kół Oddz. Broni Pancernej. Londyn 1971.
