= Janów, Gmina Bełchatów =

Janów
- Village
- Location within Poland
- Coordinates: 51°19′48″N 19°27′32″E
- Country: Poland
- Voivodeship: Łódź
- County: Bełchatów
- Gmina: Bełchatów

Janów [ˈjanuf] is a village in the administrative district of Gmina Bełchatów, within Bełchatów County, Łódź Voivodeship, in central Poland.

== History ==
During the German invasion of Poland in September 1939, Janów was used as a headquarters and reserve position by the 2 Pułk Piechoty Legionów, a Polish infantry regiment commanded by Colonel Ludwik Czyżewski. The regiment moved from the Bełchatów–Grocholice area to Janów during the night of 2–3 September 1939. Its headquarters were located in Janów's local school, while its reserve II Battalion was positioned in the surrounding area. Between 3-6 September, the regiment took part in fighting against German forces as part of the Battle of Borowa Góra. The regiment subsequently withdrew from Janów toward Piętków.
