= Chizhevski (disambiguation) =

Chizhevsky or Chizhevski is a Russian surname.

Chizhevski may also refer to:

- Chizhevski BOK-1, experimental high-altitude aircraft
- Chizhevski BOK-5, experimental tail-less aircraft
- Czyżewski, if translated into English via Russian from the times when Poland was part of the Russian Empire

== See also ==
- 3113 Chizhevskij, minor planet of asteroid belt
