= Czyżewski =

Czyżewski (Polish pronunciation: [tʂɨˈʐɛfski]; feminine: Czyżewska; plural: Czyżewscy) is a Polish toponymic surname associated with the place names such as Czyżew, Czyżewo, etc., derived from the Polish word czyż, meaning 'siskin'. In rare occasions a man could have the feminine form of the sername and vice versa. Similar surnames are Chyzheuski or Čyžeŭski (from Belarusian: Чыжэўскі), Chyzhevskyi/Chyzhevskyy (from Ukrainian: Чижевський), and Chizhevsky/Chizhevski (from Russian: Чижевский). The surname may refer to:

- Danuta Rynduch-Czyżewska, stage name Danuta Rinn (1936–2006), Polish singer and actress
- Elżbieta Czyżewska (1938–2010), Polish actress
- Ignacy Stanisław Czyżewski
- Józef Czyżewski
- Krzysztof Czyżewski (born 1958), Polish author
- Ludwik Czyżewski
- Michalina Czyżewska
- Tytus Czyżewski (1880–1945), Polish painter
- Wacław Czyżewski
- Zygmunt Czyżewski (1910–1998), Polish football player and manager

== See also ==
- Chizhevsky
