= Chizhevsky =

The Russian-language surname Chizhevsky (feminine: Chizhevskaya) corresponds to the Polish-language surname Czyżewski. The Ukrainian spelling is Chyzhevskyi.

Notable people with the surname include:

- Oleksandr Chyzhevskyi (born 1971), Ukrainian soccer player and coach
- Alexander Chizhevsky (1897–1964), Soviet biophysicist, Russian cosmist
- Dmytro Chyzhevsky (1894 – 1977), Ukrainian-born scholar of Slavic literature, history, culture and philosophy
- Heorhii Chyzhevskyi (born 1924), Ukrainian centenarian masters swimmer and World War II veteran
- Ilya Chizhevsky (born 1978), Russian businessman
- Kim Chizevsky-Nicholls (born 1968), American bodybuilder
- Vasily Georgevich Chizhevsky or Vasile Cijevschi (1880–1931), Russian rittmaster, Russo-Japanese War participant, Bessarabia politician, administrator and writer
- Vladimir Chizhevsky (1899–1972), Soviet aircraft engineer
