= Widlice, Pomeranian Voivodeship =

Village in Pomeranian Voivodeship, Poland

Widlice
- Village
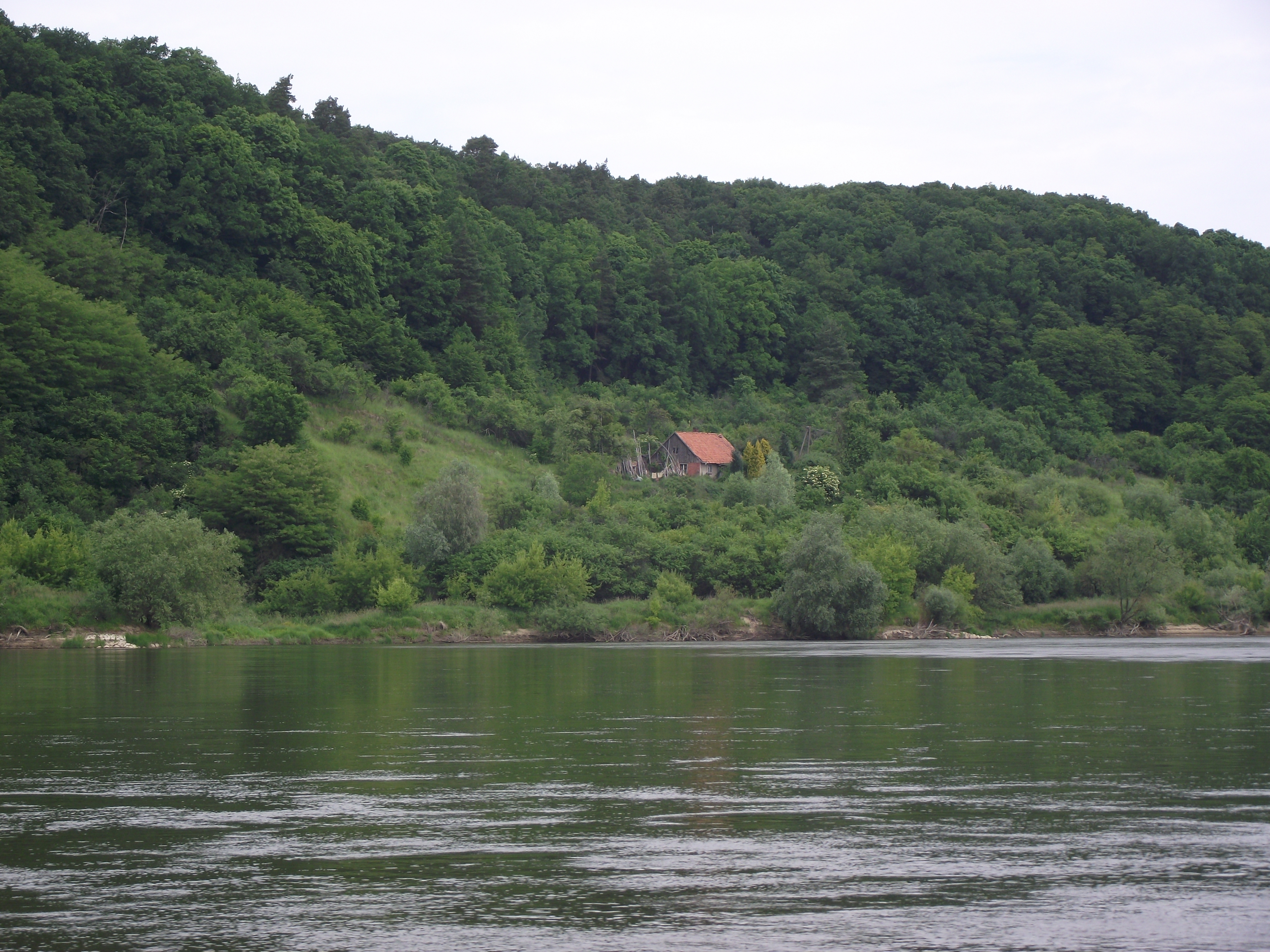

- Location within Poland
- Coordinates: 53°43′17″N 18°48′50″E
- Country: Poland
- Voivodeship: Pomeranian
- County: Tczew
- Gmina: Gniew

Population
  - Total: 145
- Time zone: UTC+1 (CET)
  - Summer (DST): UTC+2 (CEST)
- Vehicle registration: GTC

Widlice [viˈdlit͡sɛ] is a village in the administrative district of Gmina Gniew, within Tczew County, Pomeranian Voivodeship, in northern Poland. The village is located in the ethnocultural region of Kociewie in the historical region of Pomerania.

A local legend tells that during the Thirteen Years' War, peasants from the village rescued Jan z Jani from Livonian Knights who had taken him captive.

== Notable people ==
Widlice was the birth place of Józef Czyżewski.
