= 44th Infantry Division (Poland) =

Polish 44th Reserve Infantry Division
- 44 Dywizja Piechoty
- Active: 1939
- Country: Second Polish Republic
- Branch: Polish Land Forces
- Type: Infantry
- Part of: Łódź Army
- Engagements: Polish Campaign of 1939

Commanders
- Commander: Col. Eugeniusz Żongołłowicz

The Polish 44th Reserve Infantry Division was a reserve unit of the Polish Army, which took part in the Polish September Campaign. Commanded by Colonel Eugeniusz Zongollowicz, it consisted of three reserve infantry regiments: 144th (Kutno), 145th (Lowicz), and 146th (Łódź). In early September 1939, the division concentrated in the area of Tuszyn, at the rear of the Łódź Army. However, due to the speed of the Wehrmacht advance, it had never been fully created. On September 4, 1939, parts of the division were ordered to defend the area of Bełchatów, attacked by the German 1st Armored Division (see Battle of Borowa Gora). After the Germans had managed to break through Polish positions, scattered units of the 44th I.D. managed to get across the Vistula, and were ordered to head to Warsaw, where they took part in the defence of the city until its capitulation on September 28, 1939 (see Siege of Warsaw (1939)).

== See also ==
- Polish army order of battle in 1939
- Polish contribution to World War II
- List of Polish divisions in World War II
