= Czyżewo =

Czyżewo may refer to the following places:

- Czyżewo, Kuyavian-Pomeranian Voivodeship (north-central Poland)
- Czyżewo, Lubusz Voivodeship (west Poland)
- Czyżewo, West Pomeranian Voivodeship (north-west Poland)
