= Ilya Chizhevsky =

Russian businessman

- Born: Илья Петрович Чижевский; February 5, 1978 (age 47); Leningrad, USSR
- Citizenship: Russia
- Education: St. Petersburg Institute of Fine Mechanics and Optics

Ilya Petrovich Chizhevsky (Russian: Илья Петрович Чижевский; born February 5, 1978) is a Russian businessman. He graduated from St. Petersburg Institute of Fine Mechanics and Optics in 2000. Between 2006 and 2012, he occupied several managerial positions at GE Capital. Later, he worked at Société Générale. He has been President of the Russian subsidiary of OTP Bank since 2015. In 2017, the Kommersant Newspaper mentioned him among "Top 1000 Russian managers".
