= Józef Czyżewski =

Polish activist

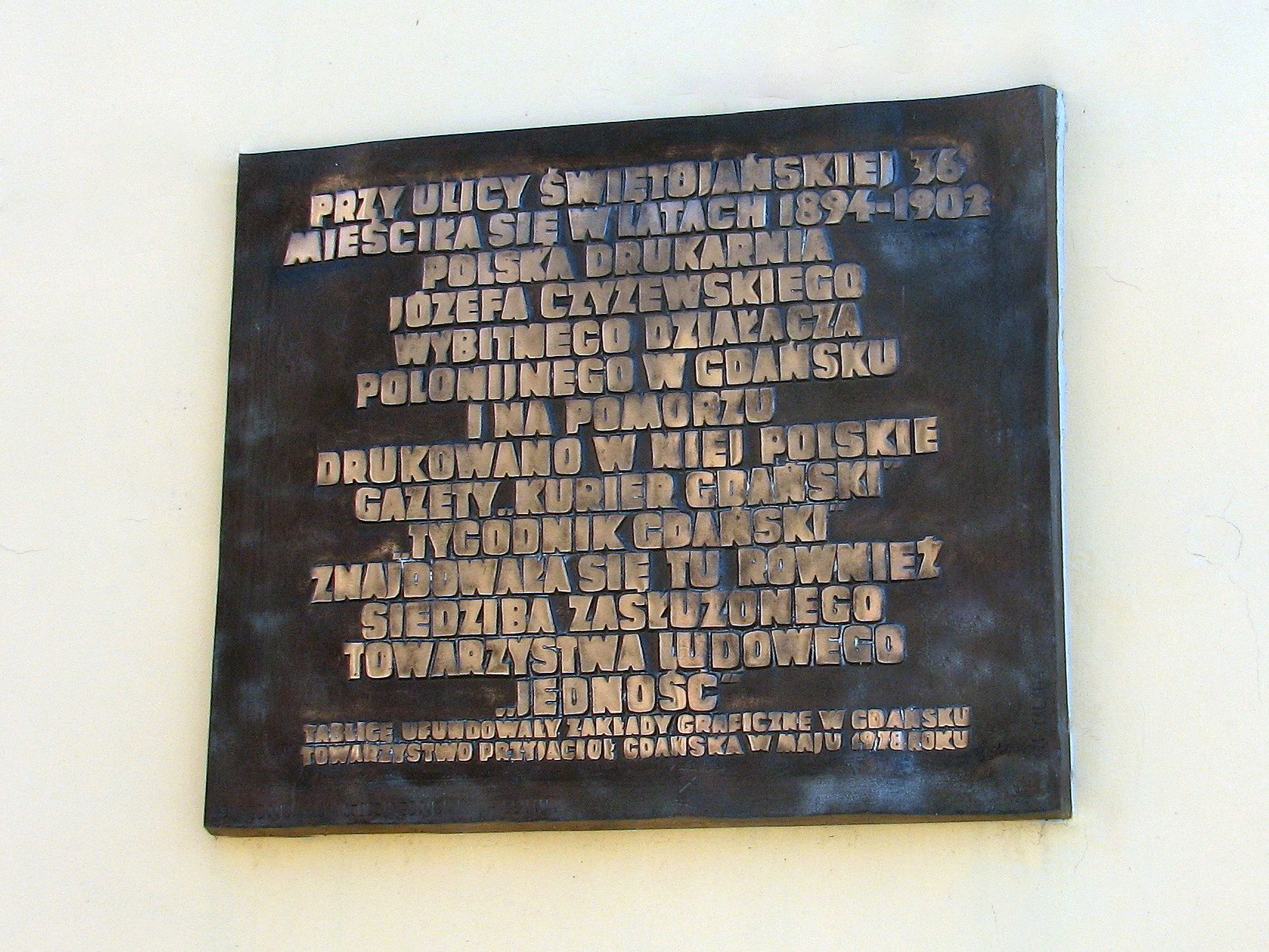
- Plaque commemorating the former printing-office of Czyżewski in Główne Miasto, Gdańsk
- Born: Józef Czyżewski; December 25, 1857; Fiedlitz, Regierungsbezirk Danzig, Kingdom of Prussia
- Died: October 21, 1935 (aged 77); Langfuhr, Free City of Danzig
- Resting place: Wrzeszcz Górny
- Occupation: Printer
- Known for: Organic work
- Movement: Positivism
- Spouse: Maria Czyżewska née Odrowska
- Children: 6
- Father: Marcin Czyżewski
- Awards: Officer's Cross Ribbon bar: Cross of Independence (Poland) Ribbon of the Cross

Józef Czyżewski (25 December 1857 – 21 October 1935) was a Kociewian-born printer and Polish national activist.

== Biography ==
=== Early life ===
Czyżewski was born in the Kociewian village, of what was then officilally known as, Fiedlitz, in the Kingdom of Prussia. His grandfather had settled in the ethnocultural region of Kociewie as a refugee following the failed November Uprising, and his family made a living from farming and wickerwork.

=== Activism ===
Czyżewski became a prominent publisher and socio-economic activist. He founded and ran several newspapers, including Gazeta Toruńska and Przyjaciel Ludu, in 1883 acquiring a printing house that became pivotal in supporting Polish causes. He was affiliated with the Polish People's Party.

=== Death ===
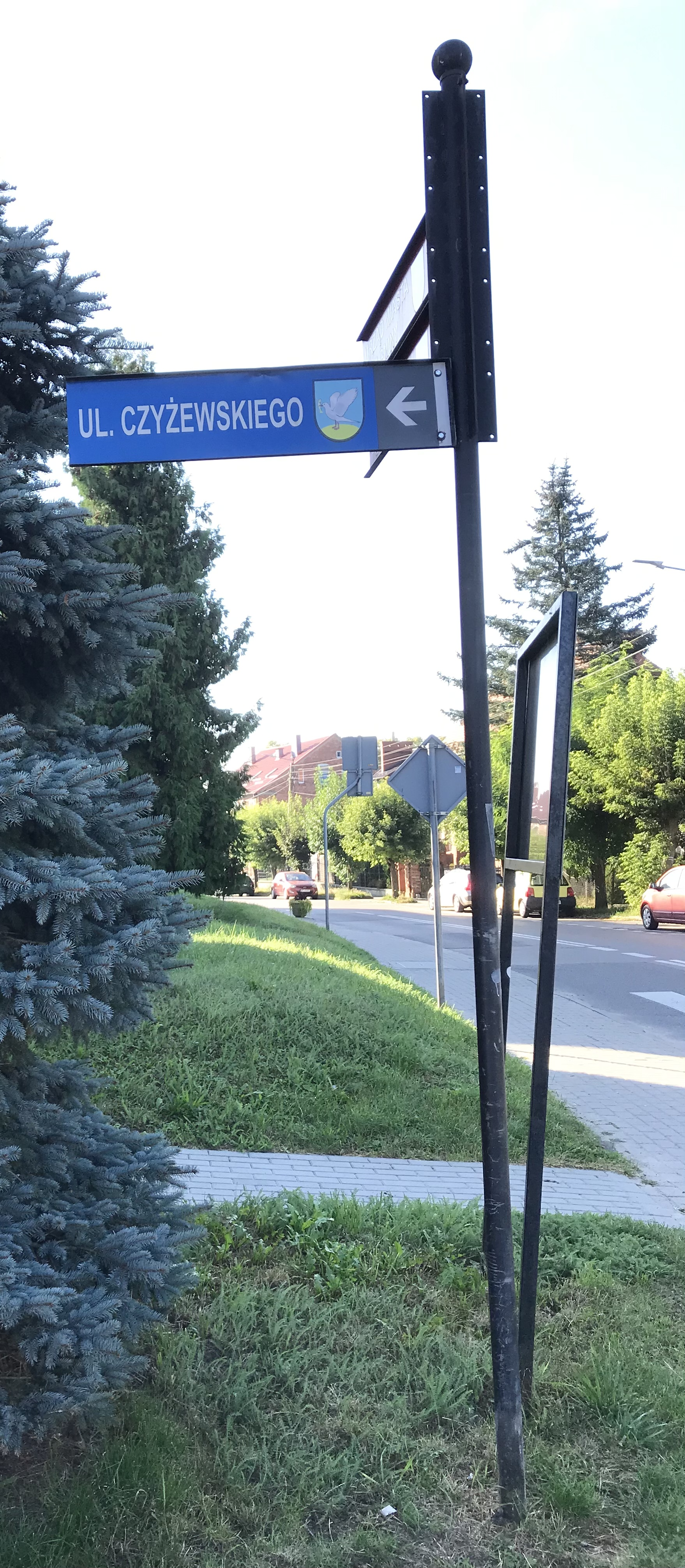
A fingerpost pointing to Czyżewski street in Gniew, Kociewie, 2024

Czyżewski died on 21 October 1935. He was originally buried in the cemetery of the Royal Chapel in Główne Miasto, before his remains were removed to the Srebrzysko Cemetery in Wrzeszcz Górny. Following World War II Ludolfiner Straße in the Gdańsk district of Oliwa was renamed Józefa Czyżewskiego in his honour.
