= 2nd Legions' Infantry Regiment =

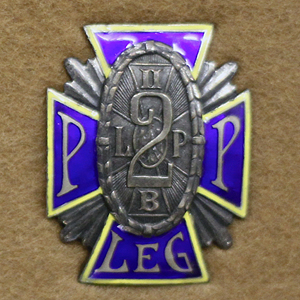
- Active: 1914 – 1939; August 1944 – 1945
- Country: Austria-Hungary (1914-1918); Poland (1918-1939); Home Army (1944-1945)
- Role: Infantry
- Garrison/HQ: Sandomierz
- Engagements: World War I Polish-Soviet War; World War II: Invasion of Poland; Battle of Borowa Góra; Battle of Modlin; Operation Tempest

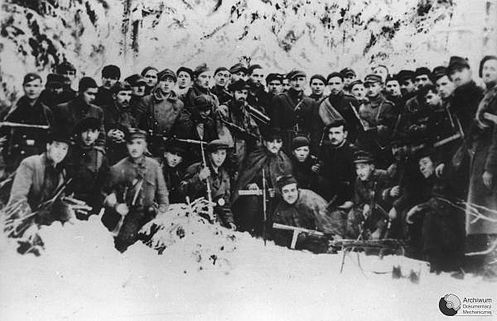
Last picture of the 4th company of 2nd Home Army Legions' Infantry Regiment, shortly before the unit was disbanded and most of its soldiers arrested by the NKVD; January 1945

The 2nd Legions' Infantry Regiment (Polish: 2. pułk piechoty legionów, 2ppLeg) was a Polish military unit active between 1914 and 1944. Initially a part of the Polish Legions in World War I, after the war it was incorporated into the Polish Army. Disbanded after the Invasion of Poland in 1939, it was recreated during the Armia Krajowa's Operation Tempest.

The regiment was first formed in 1914 in Kraków, as part of the Polish Legions fighting alongside the Austro-Hungarian Army. Initially a part of the Eastern Legion, with time it was joined with the 2nd Brigade of the Polish Legions ~ 2nd "IRON CARPATHIAN BRIGADE". It avoided destruction on the fronts of the Great War and was merged into the newly reborn Polish Army in 1918. It took part in the Polish-Bolshevik War. After the Peace of Riga had been signed, the unit was partly demobilized and stationed in Sandomierz, where it formed a part of the Polish 2nd Legions' Infantry Division. With that unit the regiment, headed by Col. Ludwik Czyżewski, formed the backbone of the Piotrków Operational Group at the start of the Invasion of Poland in 1939. Initially separated from its division, the regiment fought in the battle of Borowa Góra on 5 September. On 9 September it joined its division and covered its retreat towards Warsaw. After heavy fights on 12 and 13 September, fought in the area of Błonie, Ołtarzew and Ożarów, the regiment crossed the Kampinos Forest and reached the Modlin Fortress. There, the regiment took part in defence of that area until the capitulation of the fortress on 29 September.

In August 1944, during the Operation Tempest, the 2nd Regiment was recreated from smaller partisan units as part of the 2nd Division fighting in the area of Sandomierz and Opatów. Commanded by Lt.Col. Antoni Wiktorowski Kruk, it fought against the German Army in that area until September, when it was disbanded. However, its sub-units continued to operate in the area until January 1945, when they were overrun by the Red Army. Most of its soldiers, much like the rest of Armia Krajowa, were then rounded up by the NKVD, disarmed and either forcibly conscripted to the Communist-supported Polish People's Army or sent to the Gulags in USSR.

== Notes and references ==
In-line:
