= Battle of Borowa Góra =

Coordinates: 51°22′00″N 19°23′00″E

- Part of Invasion of Poland
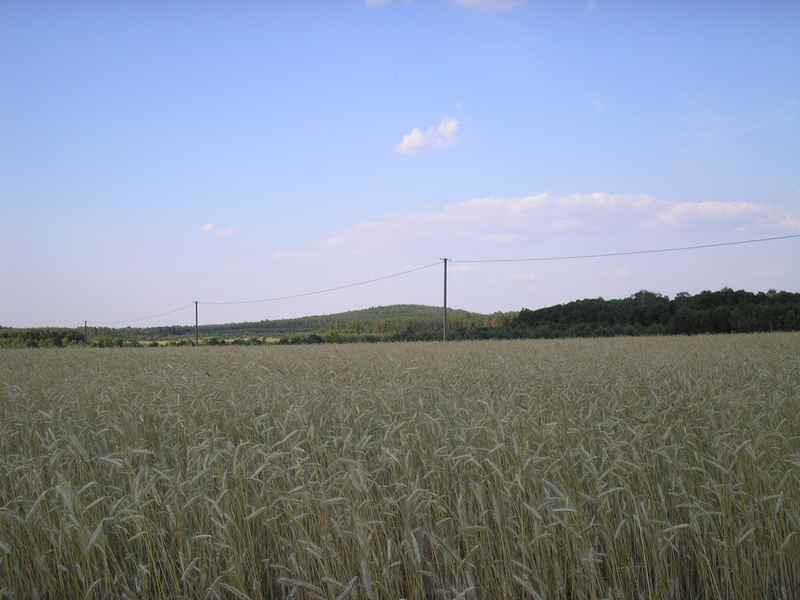
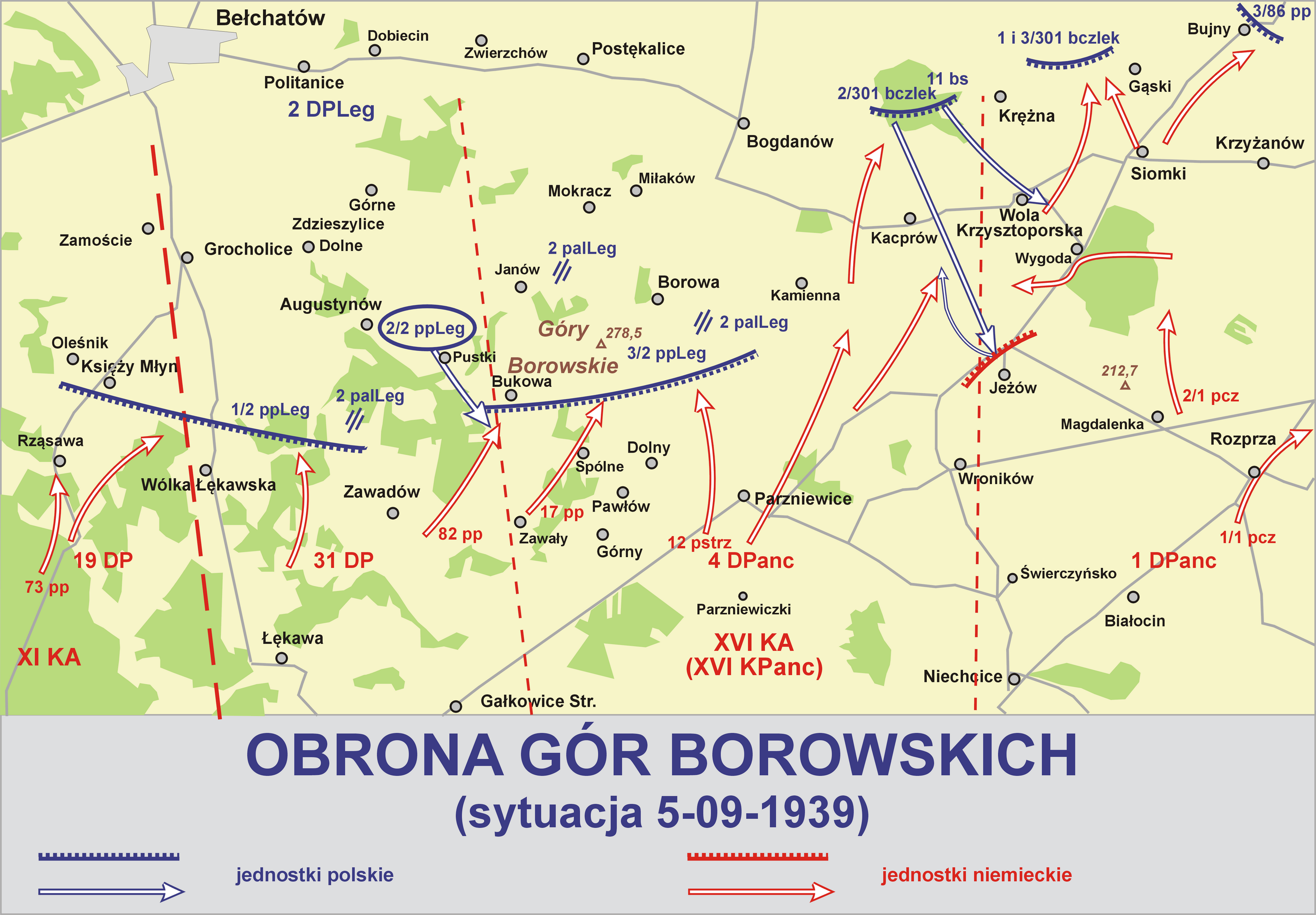
- Góry Borowskie in 2006 Map of the battle
Date	2–6 September 1939
Location	Near Bełchatów, Łódź Voivodeship, Poland
Result	German victory

Belligerents
Germany	Poland

Commanders and leaders
(Nazi Germany) Erich Hoepner	(Second Polish Republic) Ludwik Czyżewski

Strength
XVI Panzer Corps	2nd Legions' Infantry Regiment

Casualties and losses
650 killed 540 wounded 100 captured	580 killed 250 wounded

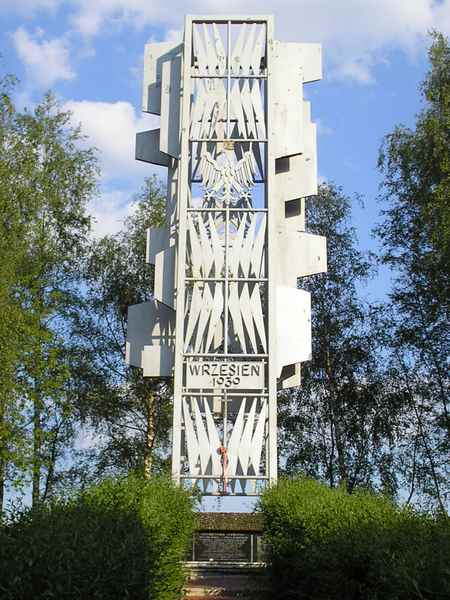
Monument erected to commemorate the battle

Battle of Borowa Góra (Polish: Bitwa pod Borową Górą) refers to the series of battles from 2 to 6 September 1939 that took place near the Góry Borowskie hills, south west from Piotrków Trybunalski and east of Bełchatów. The battle, fought between the Wehrmacht and the Polish Army in the vicinity of Łódź, was a direct consequence of the Battle of the Border, an early part of the German Invasion of Poland.

The three hills (278 meters above sea level) formed an important strategic point that the German XVI Army Corps needed to break through in order to advance toward Radomsko, Piotrków Trybunalski and Bełchatów, and further into central Poland. The area was defended by the Polish 2nd Legions' Infantry Regiment (part of the 2nd Legions Infantry Division), under Col. Ludwik Czyżewski, and the 146th Infantry Regiment (part of the 44th Infantry Division), under Col. Artur Pollak. Both Polish units belonged to Łódź Army. The invading German XVI Army Corps consisted of the 1st Panzer Division, the 4th Panzer Division, the 14th Infantry Division, and the 31st Infantry Division. During the intense fighting, Polish casualties from the 2nd Legions' Regiment were 663 (including 16 officers and 67 NCOs).

== Background ==
General Wiktor Thommée, who commanded Piotrków Operational Group of Łódź Army, ordered Colonel Czyżewski to defend a 25-kilometer line in the area of Rozprza. Polish units were supposed to hold their positions until September 4, when a Polish counterattack was planned from the Sulejów forests. Since Czyżewski did not have enough soldiers, he decided to man three main defensive positions, and to patrol the space between them. Center of Polish defence was established in the Góry Borowskie hills. Polish units began to man their positions in the night of September 2/3. Janowski's headquarters were at a public school in the village of Janów. General Juliusz Rómmel, aware of German superiority, decided to reinforce Czyżewski, by sending the 301st Battalion of Light Tanks under Major Edmund Karpow, which consisted of 49 7TP tanks developed from the British Vickers tanks.

== The battle ==
First German units approached Polish positions near Rozprza on September 3, at 13:00. Two hours later the Panzers attacked the Góry Borowskie hills, and the fighting lasted for several hours, until the night. The Wehrmacht was supported by the Luftwaffe, which bombed Polish positions, and as a result, some soldiers of the Polish Army abandoned their posts. In the evening of September 3, leading units of the German 1st Panzer Division captured Rozprza, to be pushed back after some time. At app. 15:00 tanks of the 4th Panzer Division attacked Góry Borowskie, but after a fierce battle with Polish 3rd Battalion of Major Żelazowski, they retreated and regrouped at night, to attack the hills from the east in the morning of September 4.

On September 4 in the morning, German infantry of the 31st I.D. attacked along the road to Bełchatów. They were pushed back, but near Rozprza, where Panzer divisions were present, Polish defenders faced more danger. The 1st Panzer attacked Rozprza, and the 4th Panzer concentrated its efforts on capturing Jeżów. In the afternoon of September 4, whole Polish frontline was attacked between Góry Borowskie and Rozprza. Fighting lasted into the night, and in the morning of September 5, the Germans attacked again, with the support of the Luftwaffe. Under the circumstances Colonel Czyżewski ordered retreat towards Dłutów, opening for the Wehrmacht the road to Piotrków. Since some Polish units were not aware of Czyżewski's order, in some spots fighting continued until morning of September 6.

== See also ==
- Battle of Łódź
- List of World War II military equipment of Poland
- List of German military equipment of World War II
