= Ludwik Czyżewski =

Polish Army general (1892–1985)

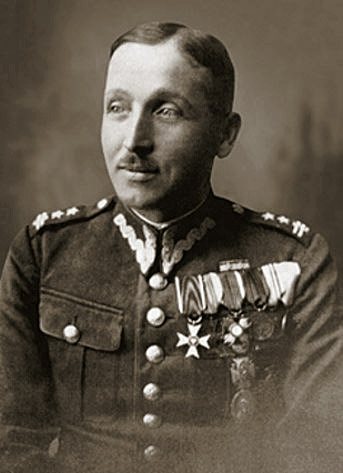
- Born: October 8, 1892; Wiszniów, Galicia-Lodomeria, Austria-Hungary
- Died: March 25, 1985 (aged 92); Wrocław, Wrocław Voivodeship, Poland
- Burial place: Old Cemetery, Piotrków Trybunalski
- Military career
- Allegiance: Austria-Hungary; Poland
- Branch: Austro-Hungarian Army; Polish Armed Forces; Home Army
- Service years: 1914 – 1945
- Rank: Brigadier General
- Nicknames: Julian; Dalia; Wiktor; Franciszek; Beskid
- Commands: 2nd Legions' Infantry Regiment
- Conflicts: World War I Polish–Soviet War; World War II: Invasion of Poland; Battle of Borowa Góra; Battle of Modlin (surrendered)

Ludwik Czyżewski was a Polish General during the Invasion of Poland during World War II. He commanded the 2nd Legions' Infantry Regiment during the Battle of Borowa Góra but was defeated in the battle. He was also a member of the Border Protection Corps as well as the Home Army before being posthumously promoted to Brigadier General in 1972 by the President-in-Exile, Stanisław Ostrowski.

== Biography ==
In 1911, he passed his secondary school examination at the Brzeżany Gymnasium. He then studied medicine in Lviv, where he was active in the Active Combat Association and the Riflemen's Association. In 1914, he was conscripted into the Austro-Hungarian Army. He fought on the Eastern and Italian fronts as a company commander. Its parent unit was the 100th Infantry Regiment. During his service in the Austro-Hungarian Army, he was promoted to second lieutenant on September 1, 1915, and lieutenant on November 1, 1917. In October 1918, he created the village of The Polish branch in Ljubljana, headed by a return to Poland.

From November 1918 in the Polish Armed Forces, he co-founded the 9th Infantry Regiment (later the 26th Infantry Regiment), a company commander, and then battalion commander and was promoted to captain on June 1, 1919. He then participated in the Silesian Uprisings and then in the Polish-Soviet War. In the period October 1920 – 1922 in the Ministry of Military Affairs. In 1922, he was in a course for staff officers at the Infantry Training Center and from 1923 to 1924, he was a battalion commander in the 25th Infantry Regiment. Czyżewski was promoted to Major on August 15, 1924, and in 1928, he was quartermaster of the 25th Infantry Regiment. On March 31, 1930, he was transferred to the Border Protection Corps to the position of the commander of the Bereźne Battalion. He was then promoted to lieutenant colonel with seniority on January 1, 1931, in the corps of infantry officers. On March 23, 1932, he was transferred to the 2nd Legions' Infantry Regiment in Sandomierz to the position of deputy regiment commander. In 1935, he took command of this regiment and commanded it during the Invasion of Poland. He was promoted to colonel with seniority on January 1, 1937, in the corps of infantry officers.

After the Third Reich's invasion of Poland, on September 5, 1939, he commanded the Polish forces at the Battle of Borowa Góra. He fought until September 28 after he surrendered during the Battle of Modlin.

During the German occupation, he did not go into captivity and was an active member of the SZP, ZWZ and the Home Army. He was the commandant of the Home Army Łódź District and the commandant of the Home Army Lviv District.

After the war, he initially worked as a teacher at a school in Adamki in the Kalisz poviat. In 1946, he came out of hiding and returned to his family. He moved to Wrocław, where he worked on the reconstruction of the town hall, then at Książnica-Atlas in Wrocław, before retiring in 1968 as the director of the institution.

He was buried in the Old Cemetery in Piotrków Trybunalski.

Czyżewski was also an author of memoirs about the defense of Modlin as well as the brother of Julian Czyżewski.

The President of the Republic of Poland in exile appointed a brigadier general with seniority on May 3, 1972, in the corps of generals.

== Awards ==
- Virtuti Militari, Gold Cross
- Virtuti Militari, Silver Cross (No. 11821)
- Order of Polonia Restituta, Knight's Cross
- Cross of Valour (Awarded twice, first cross awarded in 1921
- Cross of Merit, Golden Cross
- Cross of Independence (January 9, 1932, "for work in the work of regaining independence")

=== Foreign Awards ===
- (Austria-Hungary) : Military Merit Medal, Bronze Medal of Military Merit with swords on the ribbon
- (Austria-Hungary) : Medal for Bravery, Gold Cross
- (Austria-Hungary) : Medal for Bravery, Silver Cross
- (Austria-Hungary) : Medal for Bravery, Bronze Cross
- (Austria-Hungary) : Karl Troop Cross
