= List of equipment of the Moldovan Armed Forces =

The following is a list of current equipment of the Moldovan Armed Forces.

== Land Forces ==
=== Infantry equipment ===
==== Clothing ====
| Model | Image | Origin | Type | Details |
Camouflage
| M2017 | | Romania | Camouflage pattern | Seen in use on ballistic protection equipment that was possibly donated by Romania. |
| U.S. Woodland | | United States | Camouflage pattern | To be replaced by new multicam camouflage pattern. |
| MultiCam | | United States | Camouflage pattern | New standard issue camouflage pattern that will gradually replace the current stock of U.S. Woodland camo. |

==== Protection ====
| Model | Image | Origin | Type | Details |
Helmets
| SSh-68 | | Soviet Union | Combat helmet | |
| PASGT | | United States | Combat helmet | Standard issue combat helmet of the Moldovan National Army. Romanian ST-4 helmet derived from the PASGT also seen in use. |
| Ops-Core FAST | | United States | Combat helmet | Used by the Fulger Battalion. Sentry XP Mid Cut-type helmets also used. |
Ballistic protection equipment
| Interceptor Body Armor | | United States | Bulletproof vest | Standard issue body armor of the Moldovan National Army. |
| Stimpex VST-1 | | Romania | Bulletproof vest | Used in exercises by the 22nd Peacekeeping Battalion, possibly donated by Romania. |
| 4030 ELITE | | United Kingdom | Bomb suit | NP Aerospace bomb suit. Donated by the European Union under the European Peace Instrument (EPF). |
Gas masks
| PMG | | Soviet Union | Gas mask | |
| PG-1 | | Soviet Union | Gas mask | |
| M50 | | United Kingdom | Gas mask | Received through the NATO Defence Capabilities Building Initiative (DCBI) |

=== Infantry weapons ===
==== Small arms ====
| Model | Image | Origin | Type | Notes |
Pistols
| TT-33 | | Soviet Union | Semi-automatic pistol | Regular Army. |
| Makarov | | Soviet Union | Semi-automatic pistol | Regular Army, Special Forces, Police etc. |
| Glock 17 | | Austria | Semi-automatic pistol | Special Forces. |
Assault rifles
| AK-74 | | Soviet Union | Assault rifle | AK-74, AKS-74, AKS-74U variants Regular Army, Special Forces, Police etc. |
| AKM | | Soviet Union | Assault rifle | AKM, AKMS variants. Regular Army and Special Forces. |
| M4 carbine | | United States | Assault rifle | Special Forces |
| PM md. 63/65 | | Romania | Assault rifle | Regular Army and Police. |
| CZ BREN 2 | | Czech Republic | Assault rifle | Used in small numbers by the Regular Army. |
| Steyr AUG | | Austria | Assault rifle | Seen in use with the 22nd Peacekeeping Battalion. |
Machine guns
| PK machine gun | | Soviet Union | General purpose machine gun | Regular Army. |
| RPK | | Soviet Union | Light machine gun | Regular Army. |
| M240 machine gun | | United States | Medium machine gun | Donated by the United States. |
| MG 3 machine gun | | Germany | General-purpose machine gun | Regular Army. |
| DShK | | Soviet Union | Heavy machine gun | Also used in anti-aircraft role. |
| NSV machine gun | | Soviet Union | Heavy machine gun | Regular army. |
| M2 Browning | | United States | Heavy machine gun | Donated by the United States, mounted on Humvees, Piranha IIIHs and tripods. |
Precision rifles
| Dragunov SVD | | Soviet Union | Designated marksman rifle | Regular Army, Special Forces and Police. |
| PSL | | Romania | Designated marksman rifle | Regular Army, Special Forces and Police. |
| FR F2 sniper rifle | | France | Sniper rifle | |
| M110 | | United States | Semi-automatic sniper rifle | Donated by the United States. |
| M107A1 | | United States | Anti materiel sniper rifle | Donated by the United States. |
Ceremonial rifles
| SKS | | Soviet Union | Semi-automatic rifle | Used as a ceremonial rifle by the Honor Guard Company |

==== Explosive weapons ====
| Model | Image | Origin | Type | Caliber | Notes |
Grenades
| F-1 | | Soviet Union | Hand grenade | | Regular Army, Special Forces, Police. |
| RGD-5 | | Soviet Union | Hand grenade | | Regular Army and Special Forces. |
| Zarya Stun Grenade | | Soviet Union | Stun grenade | | Regular Army, Special Forces, Police. |
Grenade launchers
| GP-25 | | Soviet Union | Grenade launcher | 40 mm | Regular Army, Special Forces and Police. |
| Mk 19 | | United States | Automatic grenade launcher | 40 mm | Mounted on Humvees. |
Shoulder-fired/mounted weapons
| RPG-7 AG-7 | | Soviet Union Romania | Rocket-propelled grenade | 40 mm | Mainly Regular Army, Special Forces and Police. |
| RPG-22 | | Soviet Union | Rocket-propelled grenade | 72.5 mm | Regular Army and Special Forces. |
| 9K115 Metis | | Soviet Union | Anti-tank guided missile | 94 mm | |
| 9K111 Fagot | | Soviet Union | Anti-tank guided missile | 120 mm | 71 pieces. |
| 9M113 Konkurs | | Soviet Union | Anti-tank guided missile | 135 mm | 19 pieces. |
| Spike | | Israel | Anti-tank guided missile | 130mm | Spike LR variant |
| SPG-9 AG-9 | | Soviet Union Romania | Recoilless rifle | 73 mm | 138+ pieces. |
Mines
| MON-50 | | Soviet Union | Anti-personnel mine | | Regular Army and Special Forces. |
| TM-46 | | Soviet Union | Anti-tank mine | | Regular Army and Special Forces. |

=== Combat vehicles ===
| Model | Image | Origin | Type | Variant | Numbers | Notes |
Infantry Fighting Vehicles
| BMD-1 | | Soviet Union | Infantry Fighting Vehicle | | 44 | |
| BMD-1P | | Soviet Union | Infantry Fighting Vehicle | | 9 | |
Armoured Fighting Vehicles
| BRDM-2 | | Soviet Union Romania Moldova | Scout car | | ~8 | (With TAB-71M Turret). |
| MT-LB | | Soviet Union | Armoured Fighting Vehicle | | 25 | |
| MT-LB | | Soviet Union Moldova | Armoured Fighting Vehicle | | 2+ | (With ZU-23-2 AA Gun). |
| MT-LBu | | Soviet Union | Armoured Fighting Vehicle | | 13-20 | |
| BTR-60PU-12 | | Soviet Union Moldova | Armoured Fighting Vehicle | | At least 10 | (With ZU-23-1 AA Gun). |
Armoured Personnel Carriers
| GT-MU | | Soviet Union | Armoured Personnel Carrier | | Unknown | |
| BTR-60PB | | Soviet Union | Armoured Personnel Carrier | | 12 | |
| BTR-70 | | Soviet Union | Armoured Personnel Carrier | | 8 | |
| TAB-71 | | Romania | Armoured Personnel Carrier | TAB-71M | 161 | Originally 161 delivered between 1992 and 1995. |
| BTR-80 | | Soviet Union | Armoured Personnel Carrier | | 12 | |
| BTR-D | | Soviet Union Moldova | Airborne Armoured Personnel Carrier | | ~3 Unknown | (With 12.7mm DShK In Cupola). (With 73mm SPG-9 RCL And 12.7mm DShK In Cupola). |
| Piranha IIIH | | Switzerland | Armoured Personnel Carrier | | 19 (+14) | Former Danish Piranha IIIs purchased and donated by Germany in 2023. Further Germany plans to finance the purchase of 14 Piranha IIIs. |
| Piranha V | | Germany | Armoured Personnel Carrier | | 5 | Piranha 5 received by the National Army through German cooperation. |
Armoured multi-purpose vehicles
| Humvee | | United States | Multi-purpose armored vehicle | | 129 | With MAK armor. |
| Roshel Senator | | Canada | Infantry mobility vehicle | | 4/100+ | Over 100 vehicles procured by the Estonian Center for Defense Investments. The order is financed through EPF funds. To be delivered by May 2027. |

=== Engineering vehicles ===
| Model | Image | Origin | Type | Variant | Numbers | Notes |
Engineering vehicles
| IMR-2 | | Soviet Union | Armoured engineering vehicle | | Unknown | |
| PTS-2 | | Soviet Union | Tracked amphibious transport | | Unknown | |
| RKhM Kashalot | | Soviet Union | Chemical Reconnaissance Vehicle | | Unknown | |
| BRDM-2RKh | | Soviet Union | Chemical Reconnaissance Vehicle | | Unknown | |
| GMZ-3 | | Soviet Union | Minelayer | | Unknown | |
| PMZ-4 | | Soviet Union | Minelayer | | Unknown | |
| BTM-3 | | Soviet Union | Tracked trench-digging vehicle | | Unknown | |
| MDK-2M | | Soviet Union | Tracked trench-digging vehicle | | Unknown | Based on the heavy AT-T tractor (itself based on a T-54 chassis). |
| PZM-2 | | Soviet Union | Trench-digging machine | | Unknown | Trench-digging machine based on a T-150K wheeled tractor. |
| PMP | | Soviet Union | Pontoon bridge | | Unknown | |
Explosive ordnance disposal robots
| CALIBER T5 | | Canada | Tracked military robot | | Unknown | Delivered in 2026 from the European Union through the European Peace Facility (EPF). |

=== Multi-purpose vehicles ===
| Model | Image | Origin | Type | Variant | Numbers | Notes |
Unarmoured multi-purpose vehicles
| Dacia Duster | | Romania | Four-wheel drive multi-purpose vehicle | | Unknown | Used by the Military Police. |
| Chevrolet | | United States | Four-wheel drive multi-purpose vehicle | M1008 | Unknown | |
| Mitsubishi L200 | | Japan | Four-wheel drive multi-purpose vehicle | | 5+ | Donated by the EU under the EPF for use by military engineers. |
| Ford F-Series | | United States | Light utility vehicle/Ambulance | | at least 12 | Donated by the EU under the EPF. |
| Ford Ranger | | United States | Light utility vehicle | | at least 22 | Delivered in 2026 from the European Union through the European Peace Facility (EPF). |
| Toyota Land Cruiser | | Japan | Four-wheel drive multi-purpose vehicle | | at least 4 | Used for MR-2 Viktor. |
Trucks
| Iveco | | Italy; Romania | Truck | Iveco ACL Iveco High Mobility Truck | at least 4 0/62 | Donated by Italy in 2018. A further 62 trucks were purchased through SAFE as part of Romania's own program. |
| Mercedes-Benz Arocs | | Germany | Truck | 2642 6x4 | 8 | Delivered in 2026 from the European Union through the European Peace Facility (EPF). |
| Mercedes-Benz Zetros | | Germany | Truck | 4x4 | at least 4 | |
| FMTV | | United States | Truck | | Unknown | Stewart & Stevenson MTV. |
| M915 | | United States | Truck | | Unknown | In service in small numbers, shown in the 2016 national day parade. |
| M35 | | United States | Truck | | Unknown | Only the M35A3 variant in service. |
| KamAZ | | Soviet Union | Truck | 4310 | Unknown | |
| Ural-4320 | | Soviet Union | Truck | 6x6 | Unknown | |
| ZIL-131 | | Soviet Union | Truck | | Unknown | |
| GAZ-66 | | Soviet Union | Truck | | Unknown | |

=== Command Posts And Communications Stations vehicles ===
| Model | Image | Origin | Type | Numbers | Notes |
|---|---|---|---|---|---|
| R-409 | | Soviet Union | Mobile radio-relay station | Unknown | |

=== Army watercraft ===
| Model | Image | Origin | Type | Variant | Numbers | Notes |
|---|---|---|---|---|---|---|
| BMK-130M | | Soviet Union | | | Unknown | |
| BMK-T | | Soviet Union | | | Unknown | |

=== Artillery ===
| Model | Image | Origin | Type | Variant | Numbers | Notes |
|---|---|---|---|---|---|---|
| BM-37 | | Romania | Mortar | 82 mm mortar | 9 | Romanian version 82 mm caliber grenade launcher model 1977. |
Towed Mortars
| 2B11 | | Soviet Union | Mortar | 120 mm | Unknown | |
Self-propelled Mortar
| 2S9 Nona | | Soviet Union | Self-propelled mortar | 120 mm | 9 | |
| ALAKRAN | | Spain | Mortar | 120 mm | 24 | |
Towed Artillery
| M-30 | | Soviet Union | Howitzer | 122 mm | 16 | |
| D-20 | | Soviet Union | Howitzer | 152 mm | 31 | |
| 2A36 Giatsint-B | | Soviet Union | Howitzer | 152 mm | 20 | |
Self-Propelled Artillery
| ATMOS 2000 | | Israel | Self-propelled artillery | 155 mm | 4 | |
Multiple Rocket Launchers
| BM-27 Uragan | | Soviet Union | Multiple rocket launcher | 220 mm | 11 | |
Artillery Tractors
| ATS-59G | | Soviet Union | Artillery tractor | | Unknown | |
Artillery Support Vehicles
| PRP-3 'Val' | | Soviet Union | Artillery reconnaissance vehicle | | Unknown | |
| 1V18 'Klyon-1' | | Soviet Union | Artillery fire control vehicle | | Unknown | |
| 1V119 | | Soviet Union | Artillery fire control vehicle | | Unknown | |
| SNAR-10 | | Soviet Union | Counter-battery radar | | Unknown | |
| 9T452 | | Soviet Union | Transporter-loader | | Unknown | |

=== Anti-tank ===
| Model | Image | Origin | Type | Variant | Numbers | Notes |
Anti-tank guns
| MT-12 | | Soviet Union | Anti-tank gun | 100 mm | 31 | |
| M1977 | | Romania | Anti-tank Gun | 100 mm | 12 | |
Self-Propelled Anti-Tank Missile Systems
| 9P148 Konkurs | | Soviet Union | Anti-tank guided missile launcher vehicle | | 6-32 | |
| 9P149 Shturm-S | | Soviet Union | Anti-tank guided missile launcher vehicle | | 27 | |

=== Anti-aircraft ===
| Model | Image | Origin | Type | Variant | Numbers | Notes |
Towed Anti-Aircraft Guns
| ZU-23-2 | | Soviet Union | | 23 mm | 28 | |
| AZP S-60 | | Soviet Union | | 57 mm | 11 | |
Self-Propelled Anti-Aircraft Guns
| KPV | | Soviet Union Moldova | | 14.5 mm | Unknown | Mounted on GAZ-66. |
| ZPU-2 | | Soviet Union Moldova | | 14.5 mm | Unknown | Mounted on GAZ-66. |
| ZU-23-2 | | Soviet Union Moldova | | 23 mm | Unknown | Mounted on GAZ-66 and on BTR-D. |
| AZP S-60 | | | | 57 mm | Unknown | Mounted on ZIL-135. |
| MR-2 Viktor | | Czech Republic | | 14.5 mm | at least 4 | Mounted on Toyota pickup trucks. |
Counter-UAV systems
| SkyWiper | | Lithuania | | | Unknown | |

=== Army aircraft ===
| Model | Image | Origin | Type | Variant | Numbers | Notes |
Unmanned Aerial Vehicles
| DJI | | China | Quadrotor UAV | Matrice 300 RTK | 18+ | |
| FPV drones | | Lithuania | FPV drone | | 100 | |
| Quantum-Systems | | Germany | SUAV | | at least 3 | |

== Air Force ==
=== Air defence ===
| Model | Image | Origin | Type | Variant | Numbers | Notes |
Surface-To-Air Missile systems
| S-125 | | Soviet Union | | | 3 | One site protecting the capital Chișinău. |
| Piorun | | Poland | | | 44 | A total of 44 Piorun MANPADS imported from Poland in 2024. |
Radars
| P-14 'Tall King' | | Soviet Union | | | Unknown | |
| P-15 'Flat Face A' | | Soviet Union | | | Unknown | |
| P-12 'Spoon Rest A' | | Soviet Union | | | Unknown | |
| P-18 'Spoon Rest D' | | Soviet Union | | | Unknown | |
| PRV-13 'Odd Pair' | | Soviet Union | | | Unknown | |
| PRV-16 'Thin Skin B' | | Soviet Union | | | Unknown | |
| 36D6 'Tin Shield' | | Soviet Union | | | Unknown | |
| SNR-125 'Low Blow' | | Soviet Union | | | Unknown | (For S-125). |
| Ground Master 200 | | France | | | 1 | Ordered and delivered in 2023. The version is a container based without any platform to secure mobility. |
| Unknown | | Unknown | | | 1 | A new radar, purchased from the 190 million euro funds provided to the Republic of Moldova through the European Peace Facility (EPF). |

== Future equipment ==
| Programme | Image | Origin | Type | Variant | Ordered | Notes |
|---|---|---|---|---|---|---|
| Air Defence Equipment | | Czech Republic | VERA-NG | | 1 | The VERA-NG passive radar was ordered in early 2024, scheduled to arrive in 2025. The order is to be financed through EPF funds. |
| Air Defence Equipment | illustrative picture only | European Union | | | Unknown | Germany promised to deliver air defence equipment in 2025 to strengthen Moldovan air defences. |
| Air Defence Equipment | illustrative picture only | European Union | | | Unknown | Moldovan MoD will purchase air defense systems through the EPF, but it's currently unclear if the German promise is included in this purchase. |
| Anti-tank weapon | | Sweden | Anti-tank weapon | AT4 | Unknown | Proposed donation by Sweden. |
| NATO type individual weapon system | illustrative picture only | | Assault rifle | 5.56×45mm NATO Assault Rifle | Unknown | It was announced by the head of the republic's Defense Ministry that the military will gradually abandon Kalashnikov assault rifles as part of the transition to NATO standards. |

== See also ==
- Armed Forces of Transnistria#Equipment
