= AT-L =

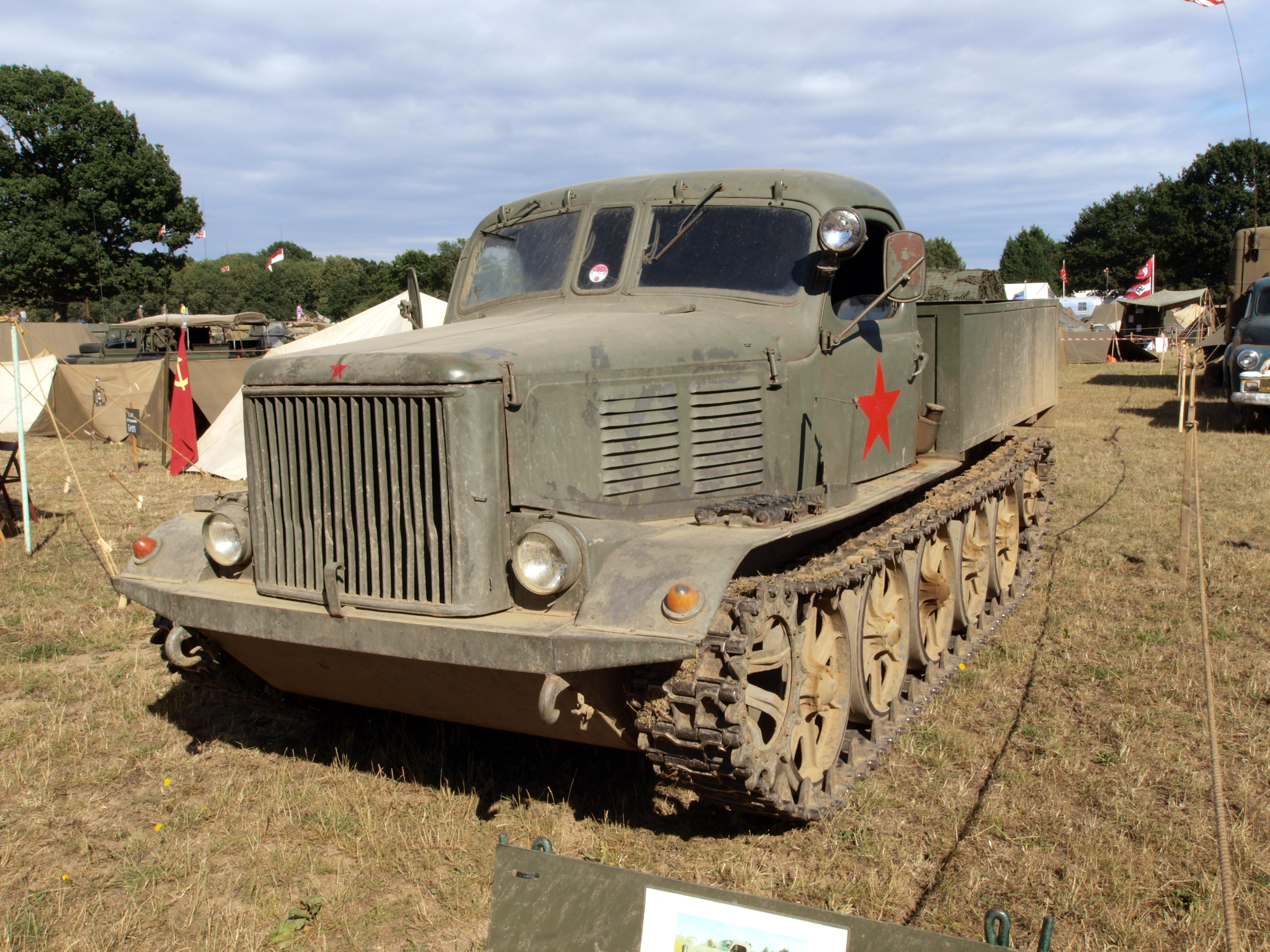
- AT-L in England in a classic vehicle show
- Type: Artillery tractor
- Place of origin: Soviet Union

Production history
- Designer: KhPZ
- Manufacturer: KhPZ
- Produced: 1947–1967
- Variants: AT-T; MDK-2M; BAT-M; BTM-3; P-40 radar

Specifications
- Mass: 5,800 kg
- Length: 5,099 mm
- Width: 2,200 mm
- Height: 2,180 mm
- Crew: 3

Artilleriyskiy Tyagach Lyogkiy, or AT-L (Russian: Артиллерийский Тягач, Лёгкий (АТ-Л), meaning light artillery tractor) was a Soviet Cold War era artillery tractor. The vehicle has the same cab as the ZIS-150 and ZIL-164 trucks, but has a different front end and grille similar to that of the GAZ-51 truck.

== History ==
The light artillery tractor AT-L was created in 1947 by the design bureau of the Kharkiv Tractor Plant. Due to the insufficient power of the only suitable diesel engine, it was necessary — for the first time in Soviet practice — to resort to a more efficient but expensive and maintenance-demanding planetary transmission without side clutches, similar to that of the Panther tank.

To overcome a one-meter-deep ford, as required by the military, improve cross-country ability in deep snow, and reduce overall weight, a welded load-bearing box-shaped hull was designed for the first time instead of a frame. Unfortunately, operational experience in the military revealed that this design did not pair well with the original running gear featuring six intermediate-diameter road wheels (due to its structural similarity with the Ya-12, the tractor was even mistakenly designated in the West as Ya-14): the mounting of the support rollers could not transfer the high loads from oscillations of the upper tracks at high speeds to the thin-walled hull. As a result, the running gear had to be redesigned with five large-diameter road wheels, which appeared somewhat awkward but were much heavier. This was done in 1954–1955, and from 1957, the HTZ-5A (also known as ATL-5A) modification was produced. It replaced the more conservative development of the Ya-12 — the M-2 tractor — which had been in production from 1948 to 1955 and is depicted in all illustrations in this article.

Various specialized vehicles were mounted on the AT-L chassis over time, including artillery reconnaissance radars SNAR-1, SNAR-2, and ARSOM-2 (ARSOM-2P), the special van 711, a fire-fighting foam lifter, a tracked bridge-layer, and others. For these purposes, versions of the tractor were produced without cargo platforms, towing devices, winches, and brake pneumatic systems for towed artillery pieces — these versions were designated as HTZ-23, HTZ-27, and HTZ-39 (from 1957: HTZ-23A, HTZ-27A, and HTZ-39A). Bulldozer equipment OLT or OLT-M could also be mounted on the AT-L.

It was produced until 1967 in several modifications and earned respect in both the army and the national economy. It was widely used for the development of hard-to-reach areas of the USSR, and by early 1975, AT-L and GTT all-terrain vehicles formed the backbone of the off-road vehicle fleet of Siberian industrial enterprises.
