= Mazur D-350 =

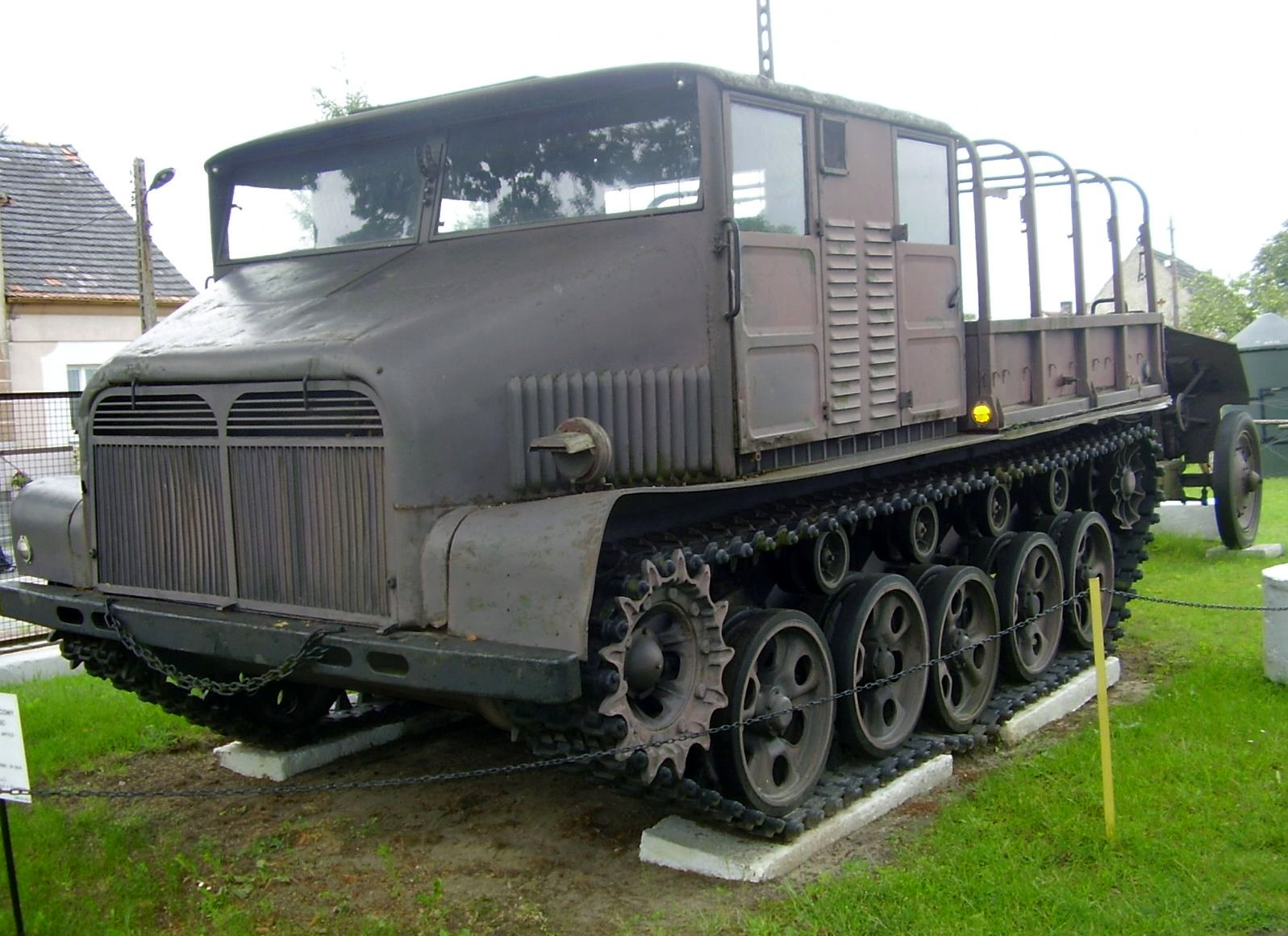
- Type: Artillery tractor
- Place of origin: Poland

Service history
- In service: 1960-1980
- Used by: See Users for details
- Wars: Warsaw Pact invasion of Czechoslovakia; Vietnam War

Production history
- Designed: 1957-1958
- Manufacturer: Bumar-Łabędy
- Produced: 1958–1960
- No. built: 1000

Specifications
- Mass: 13.5 tonnes
- Length: 5,81 m
- Width: 2,89 m
- Height: 2,69 m
- Crew: 1
- Passengers: 8
- Operational range: 490 km
- Maximum speed: 53 km/h

The Mazur D-350 is a tracked artillery tractor produced in the Polish People's Republic in the late 1950s.

== History ==
Work on the design of a Polish artillery tractor began in 1956 at the Mechanical Plant in Łabędy, using components of the T-54A tank, the licensed production of which was implemented there. The tractor was unified by about 75% with the T-54A tank. In 1957, two prototypes were created, initially designated ACS Mazur D-300. In 1958, two improved prototypes were created and in the same year the tractor was put into production, which lasted until 1960 (according to other information, from 1960 to 1961). The assembly of the tractors took place in Łabędy, where the body, drive train and road wheels were manufactured, while the chassis and suspension were manufactured by Huta Stalowa Wola, and the engines were manufactured by PZL Wola. Despite good performance, the production of the tractor was quickly ended. The reason was the unification of artillery tractors in the Warsaw Pact forces and the introduction of the Soviet ATS-59 tractor, produced in Poland under license. Comparative tests were conducted and according to the Soviet side, the ATS-59 proved to be better in most respects. About 1,000 Mazur tractors were produced.

In the Polish People's Army, Mazur D-350 artillery tractors were used until the end of the 1970s. A certain number were sold to Czechoslovakia in the early 1960s (according to Czech information, 218 of them were delivered and were to be colloquially known as Gomulkova pomsta – "Gomułka's revenge"). A small number of these tractors were transferred to the North Vietnamese army and used by it during the Vietnam War. Some of the tractors withdrawn from the army were then used, among others, by the railway in rescue trains and in forestry service.

The Mazur D-350 was a high-speed tracked tractor used in heavy artillery units for towing artillery equipment – mainly the 1937 (ML-20) howitzer of 152 mm caliber and the 1931/37 (A-19) heavy field guns of 122 mm caliber. Less frequently, it towed KS-19 100 mm anti-aircraft guns and trailers with radar equipment.

The towing force on the hook was 12.5 T, the maximum trailer weight was 25 t.

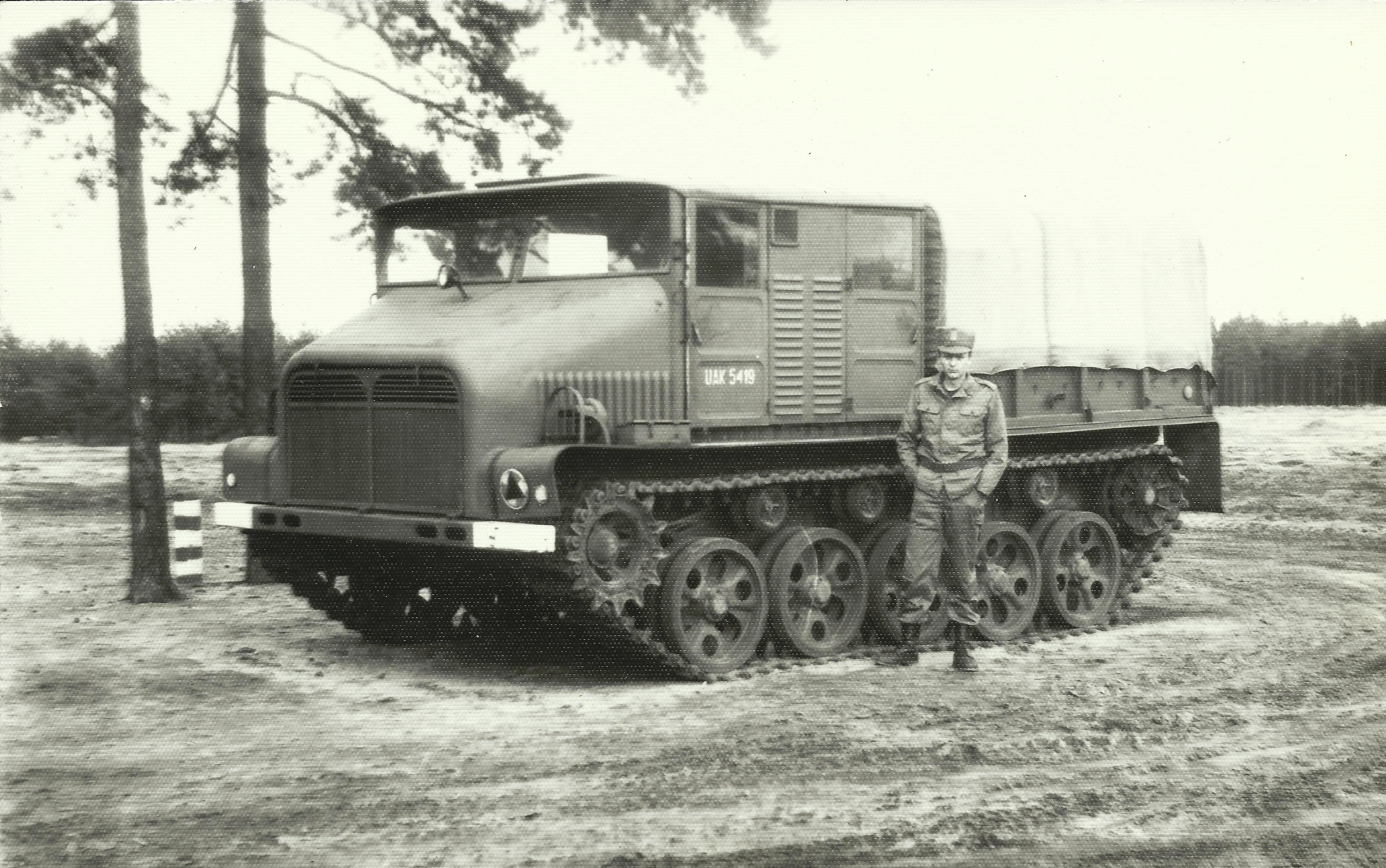
Mazur D-350

== Users ==
- Poland
- North Vietnam
- Czechoslovakia

== See also ==
- AT-T
