= MDK (disambiguation) =

MDK is a 1997 computer game by Shiny.

MDK may also refer to:

== Music ==
- "M.D.K.", a song by American electro band God Module from the album Seance
- Mëkanïk Dëstruktïẁ Kömmandöh, a 1973 album from Magma
- MDK, Dubstep artist known for Geometry Dash

== Other uses ==
- MDK (community), a group of communities on the social networking site VK.com
- MDK, Inc., the model railway manufacturing company that makes K-Line brand
- MDK, a human gene which makes a protein called Midkine
- mdk, ISO 639-3 code for the Mangbutu language
- MDK, the IATA code for Mbandaka Airport
- Minedykkerkommandoen, a Norwegian clearance diver force
- Jinan East railway station, see Jinan Metro
- Moodle, Moodle Developers Kit
- MDK, short for Mod Development Kit in Minecraft modding

== See also ==
- MDK-2M, a Soviet Cold War-era heavy artillery tractor
