= C7P =

C7P artillery tractor
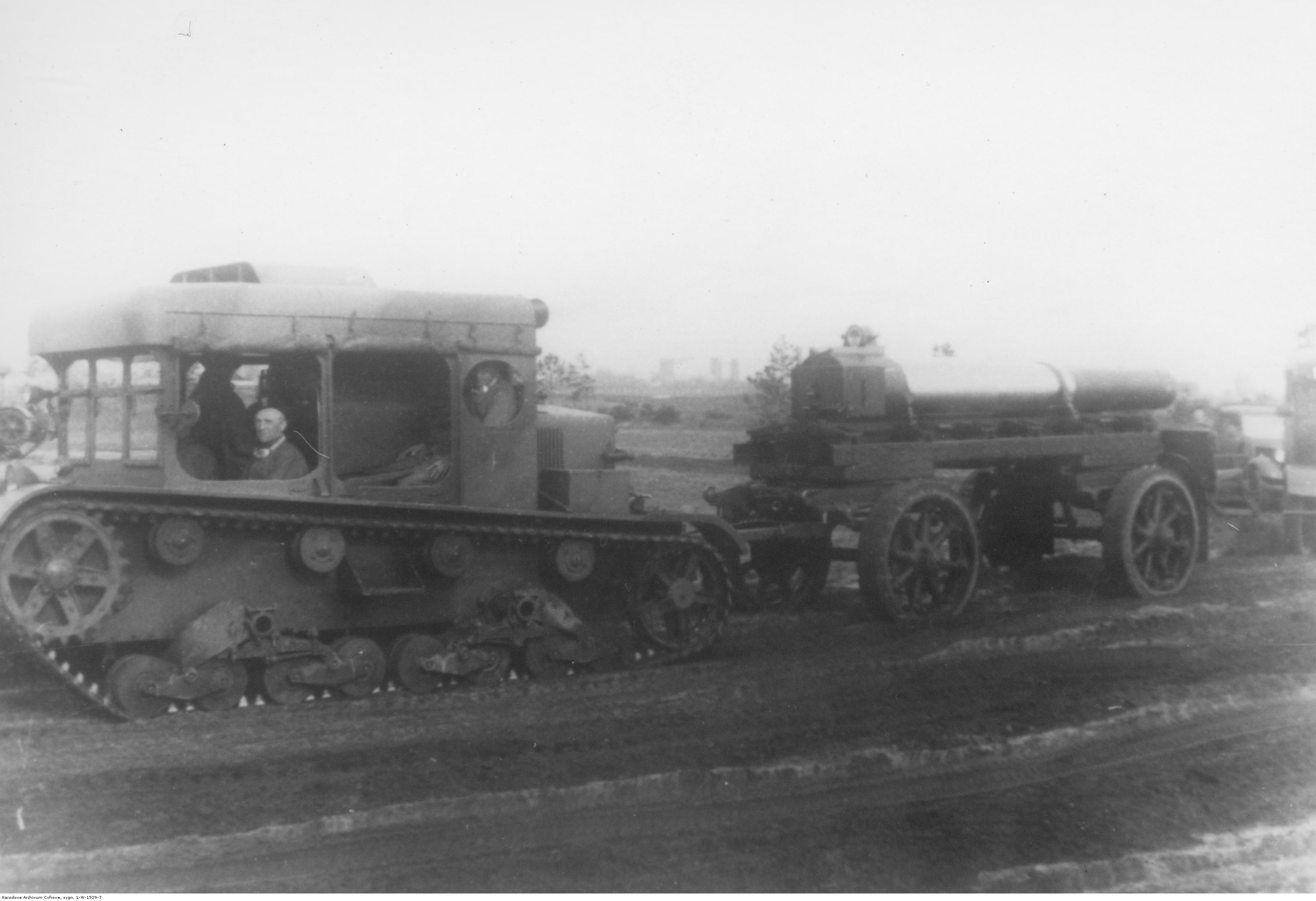
- The C7P artillery tractor towing the barrel for a wz. 32 heavy mortar.
- Type: Artillery tractor
- Place of origin: Poland

Service history
- In service: 1934 - 1939 (Poland)
- Used by: Poland, Nazi Germany, Soviet Union

Production history
- Designer: Witold Jakusz
- Designed: 1931 - 1934
- Manufacturer: PZInż
- Produced: 1934 - 1939
- No. built: 151

Specifications
- Mass: 8.5 t (8.4 long tons; 9.4 short tons)
- Length: 4.60 m (15 ft 1 in)
- Width: 2.40 m (7 ft 10 in)
- Height: 2.40 m (7 ft 10 in)
- Crew: 6-7
- Engine: PZInż. 235 diesel 115 hp (86 kW)
- Suspension: leaf spring bogie
- Operational range: 150 km (93 mi)
- Maximum speed: 26 km/h (16 mph)

C7P (an abbreviation of Ciągnik Siedmiotonowy Polski, "7-tonnes Polish Tractor") was a Polish tracked artillery tractor, used by the Polish Army before and during World War II. The tractor was developed by the design bureau of Witold Jakusz of the PZInż company between 1931 and 1934.

In 1931 Poland bought several dozens of British Vickers E tanks and a license to build additional tanks at home. The Polish Army also considered purchase of the Vickers Medium Dragon artillery tractor, based on the Vickers E, but the purchase never happened. As the British tank was considered not suited for service in the Polish climate and needed adaptation, it was decided that a similar Polish tank be built as a modification of the Vickers design. The tank, initially code-named VAU-33, in time became the 7TP. Simultaneously, work started on a new artillery tractor for the Polish Army that was to replace the Citroën-Kegresse tractors built in France in the early 1920s. The main advantage of the new model of artillery tractor, dubbed C6P, C6T and finally C7TP was to be its low price, ease of manufacture and durability. For that purpose, the C7P shared many parts with the 7TP light tank, produced simultaneously. In fact the chassis was almost a direct copy of the tank, while the superstructure was partially borrowed from a license-built Saurer bus.

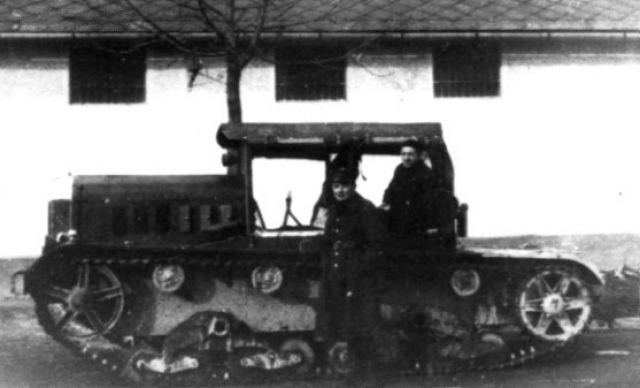
C6T Prototype

In 1933 the first two prototypes were constructed in the Ursus factory of the PZInż, the C6P and the C6T. The C6P had the engine placed in the front and used front wheel drive, while the C6T had the engine placed behind the crew compartment and used rear wheel drive. After a series of tests the C6T's engine was moved from the rear of the fuselage to the front. These modifications resulted in the C6T/II. The C6P's engine was moved to the rear and the cab was modified, whereupon it was given the designation C7P/I. Further modifications to the C7P/I resulted in the C7P/II and C7P/III prototypes, and the C6T/II was upgraded to C7P/II standards.

In 1934 production started. Out of approximately 350 ordered, only 151 were built by the outbreak of World War II. Approximately 108 were deployed to the artillery units, where the C7P was used as an artillery tractor in the regiments of heaviest artillery, mainly for towing of heavy 220 mm wz.32 Škoda mortars. An additional 18 tractors were attached to various tank units, mostly the Polish 10th Motorized Cavalry Brigade for towing of immobilized tanks and for transport of tanks to the battlefield on specially designed towing platforms. Finally, two tractors were delivered to the engineering units for road maintenance and destruction of railways in case of a war. Until 1942 an additional 52 were to be delivered to various communal services, where they were to be used as snowplows to keep the roads in good condition in case of a war. During the Invasion of Poland of 1939 all C7P were used in active service. Most were captured by the Germans and were used as towing machines and snowplows at least until 1941.

No example of the C7P survives today. However, a single C7P hull was recovered near Volgograd in around 2001. This hull was restored with a BT-5 or BT-7 turret and now looks like a T-26 tank. It is now on display at the Museum of the Great Patriotic War, Moscow, Poklonnaya Gora

== Production History ==
- 1933 - 2 prototypes
- 1934 - 1 prototype (C7P/III)
- 1934-1936 - 73 C7P tractors
- 1938 - No data available
- 1939 - 29 C7P for use as artillery towing tractors as well as 13 standard models for armored forces
