= MDK (community) =

Community in social network VK.com

- Company type: Private
- Website type: Social news and -media aggregation
- Available in: Russian
- Founded: May 21, 2011; 15 years ago
- Headquarters: Moscow, Russia
- Area served: Worldwide
- Founders: Roberto Panchvidze, Dmitry Aladyshev
- Industry: Internet; Media
- Website: mudakoff.com
- Advertising: Banner ads, promoted links
- Registration: Optional (required to submit, comment, or vote)
- Current status: Active

MDK (also МДК) is the most popular community in social network VK.com with more than 8.3 million followers (as of June 2017). By May 2016, MDK grew into a network of communities with a total monthly audience of about 20 million people.

Most of the entries in the group are funny pictures, Internet memes and demotivators on issues of the day. The content is created by users and the community administration.

== History ==
The community was founded in April 2011 by Roberto Panchvidze and Dmitry Aladyshev under the name Mudakoff (Russian: Morons). Roberto Panchvidze is the official person at the community, he began to run online communities at age 18, while studying in Moscow in the Institute of Psychology at the RSUH.

In January 2013, MDK launched a brand application for iOS. On the day of release, the application immediately became the second most popular free application in the iOS App Store after the game Shark Dash. At that time, MDK had more than 1.6 million followers.

In February 2013, Nikolay Kononov interviewed anonymous MDK creators who disclosed information about the audience (about 500 thousand visitors per day) and communities' network revenues (1.5-2 million rubles per month).

In July 2013, one of the founders of MDK de-anonymized and gave an interview to Hopes & Fears, from which it became known that MDK has about ten communities, with 20 to 30 employees working on them. According to Roberto Panchvidze, MDK has 12 million unique visitors a month. Pavel Durov called this publication paid journalism.

On June 28, 2013 moderators of VK.com for the first time temporarily blocked MDK, which had almost 3 million subscribers. The formal reason was the substitution of content in the group advertised by MDK — for the same reason many large communities blocked MDK. The social network acknowledged that MDK is not to blame for what had happened, but blamed the community for not monitoring advertised groups.

In July 2013, the social network Odnoklassniki invited Panchvidze to create a community in their social network, similar to MDK in VK.com, but "nicer". Also MDK was responsible for the creating and running the car community Fixter and the Igroteka community. Entering Classmates meant becoming less dependent on VK.com. However, in August of the same year MDK stopped its cooperation with Odnoklassniki, accusing the latter of failing preliminary arrangements to pay for video ads display, as well as using unauthorized content in their own similar communities — Accidents and Games@Mail.Ru. At that time, the monthly audience of MDK equaled 12 million people.

In October and November 2013, MDK was at the center of scandals caused by publications about the bus explosion in Volgograd and the plane crash in Kazan.

In December 2013, Rospatent approved the MDK application to register the trademark. Obtaining it would the community to more effectively fight with communities and companies using their name, and also starting from 2014 to launch branded souvenirs and clothing with the symbolics of MDK.

Since October 27, 2015, MDK has been blocked on the territory of Russia by a court decision, but soon it was relaunched at a new address — the social network VK.com transferred 7.5 million followers to the new community.

By May 2016, the MDK network of VK.com entertainment groups exceeded 20 million subscribers. Among the groups with an audience of more than a million people, besides MDK itself, there were Orlyonok, IBD, Paper Airplane and Katavasia. By the end of 2016, the team of the creative agency that grew up around MDK and the communities network, according to the company itself, employed about 30 people.

Launched in April 2017, the research company Medialogy analyzed the audience of the most popular communities in VK.com and concluded that MDK is leading in the number of views of one publication — an average of 970.7 thousand views.

== Scandals ==
Because of the risky humor and hate speech, the community has been repeatedly accused of extremism and xenophobia. In October 2013, MDK posted a meme about the bus bombing in Volgograd, which also caused a lot of resentment. Mikhail Markelov, a deputy of the United Russia party, demanded that Pavel Durov had to take responsibility for this. Pavel Durov wrote an official denial, and on 7 November the group's administrators announced that they filed a lawsuit on Markelov and demanded to collect 14,000 rubles in damages "caused to the organization as a result of spreading information which discredited its business reputation" and also demanded Markelov's official apology in the main media.

On November 17, 2013, after the plane crash in Kazan, which killed 50 people, a message appeared on behalf of the community that, because there is no online broadcast of the tragedy, "popcorn is getting cold". This post aroused resentment among parliamentarians (State Duma deputy Valery Trapeznikov suggested sending "moral freaks" to public works), Kazan residents and Internet users.

On June 16, 2015, the day when the singer Jeanna Friske died, the community posted a photo with a modified quote from her song: in the line "I have never been to Malinki" there was a word "Grave". A petition was issued on Change.org demanding a criminal or administrative case against the administration of the public. In response to the subsequent complaints of advertisers, on June, 19 the VK.com administration removed the photo in the community and disconnected MDK from the advertising exchange, depriving the community of the main source of income. Letters to the Prosecutor General's Office and Roskomnadzor with the demand to bring MDK to justice were sent by several State Duma deputies, including Maria Kozhevnikova, Joseph Kobzon and the first deputy chairman of the State Duma Committee on Public Associations and Religious Organizations Mikhail Markelov. Kobzon also said that he wants to call in a fight and "beat the hell out of" the MDK administrator.

=== Blocking in Russia ===
On October 27, 2015, the Smolninsky District Court of St. Petersburg decided to terminate the activities of MDK at the request of the prosecutor's office, which stated that materials on the page "offended the feelings of religious people, and denigrated different groups of people on the grounds of their religion and nationality". Community's owners challenged the court decision, but on February 16, 2016, the St. Petersburg City Court upheld it. The community was blocked for users from Russia on May 21, 2016, but shortly after the group transferred its followers to their new community with the same name.

== Appraisal and influence on media ==
Jokes of MDK repeatedly caused discontent of the public and deputies of the State Duma. Some scandals, as in the case of Jeanna Friske, led to the creation of petitions on the Change.org service, calling on the VK.com management to close the group "due to the establishment of a national tension situation in Russia", noting that "the main audience of the group are schoolchildren".

Experts from Herzen State Pedagogical University of Russia, in conclusion for the prosecutor's office of St. Petersburg concluded that the information of the MDK public has the signs of "insulting various groups of people on the grounds of religion and nationality, public desecration of religious and liturgical literature, objects of religious veneration, signs and emblems of worldview symbolism". Also experts came to the conclusion that materials harm the mental health of children, adolescents, and young people.

In terms of audience outreach, MDK surpasses the majority of online publications, which causes interest among advertisers. Large companies and brands like KFC, Durex, Axe Effect advertised in MDK. In August 2013, during the Moscow election campaign, the photo of politician Alexei Navalny appeared on the avatar of MDK.

Since 2017 MDK creative agency promotes Burger King company in social networks. Pixels game, one of the agency's projects, was the launched in April 2017. 132,000 people started to play it in just a few days.

== Owners and management ==
The MDK communities network belongs to the companies Hermes and Sarafanka. Sarafanka LLC, which owns the MDK trademark, belongs to Dmitry Aladyshev and Vladislav Ivashov on an equal footing. The main owner of communities, according to Fontanka.ru, was called Hermes LLC, owned by Panchvidze and Aladyshev. According to Lenta.ru, Hermes places advertising in MDK by agreement with Sarafanka.

== Links ==
- Official website
