= October 2013 Volgograd bus bombing =

Suicide bombing on a bus in the city of Volgograd, Russia

- Part of the insurgency in the North Caucasus
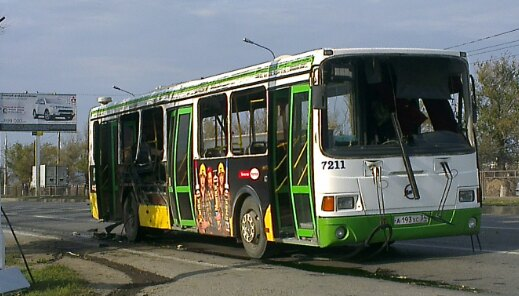
- The bus targeted by Asiyalova after the bombing

- Location of Volgograd Oblast in Russia
- Location: 48°32′02″N 44°28′11″E; Volgograd, Volgograd Oblast, Southern Federal District, Russia
- Date: 21 October 2013; 13 years ago 13:58 UTC+04:00 [09:58 GMT]
- Target: Civilians
- Attack type: Suicide attack
- Weapon: Explosive belt
- Deaths: 8 (including one of the perpetrators)
- Injuries: 41
- Perpetrators: Dmitry Sokolov; Naida Asiyalova
- Motive: North Caucasus separatist ideology

The October 2013 Volgograd bus bombing was a suicide bombing which occurred on 21 October 2013 in the city of Volgograd, in the Volgograd Oblast of Southern Russia. The attack was perpetrated by a female suicide bomber and Islamic extremist named Naida Sirazhudinovna Asiyalova, who detonated an explosive belt inside a bus carrying approximately 40 people—predominantly students. The bombing killed seven civilians and injured at least 41 others.

Asiyalova's motive to commit the Volgograd bus bombing is believed to be a symbolic statement of support referencing the North Caucasus separatist ideology. Furthermore, her incentive to die in this act may have been accentuated by a progressive and fatal bone disease she is known to have suffered in the years prior to her death.

The suicide belt worn in the bombing had been constructed by Asiyalova's husband, Dmitry Sokolov, for the specific purpose of his wife's suicide bombing. Sokolov was killed in a gunfight with Russian Special Forces one month after the bombing.

== Attack ==
At approximately 14:01 on 21 October 2013, Naida Sirazhudinovna Asiyalova (Russian: Наида Сиражудиновна Асиялова), a 30-year-old fugitive from the Republic of Dagestan, boarded a LiAZ-5256 bus in the Krasnoarmeysky district of Volgograd. The passengers on this bus were predominantly students in their late teens and early twenties returning home from classes at Volgograd State University. According to eyewitnesses, Asiyalova boarded the bus in Volgograd city centre, taking a seat towards the rear of the vehicle and silently looking out of the window as the bus made two further stops before detonating her suicide belt at 14:05, killing herself and seven others and injuring 41—several severely.

=== Investigation ===
No individuals or terrorist organization claimed responsibility for the attack. Although initial reports speculated the explosion had been caused by an "unidentified explosive device", possibly a gas leak, eyewitness testimony and physical evidence recovered from the site of the explosion enabled investigators to quickly determine the blast had been caused by a female suicide bomber wearing a green hijab who, according to one survivor, had been "looking out the window, acting calm [and] not drawing any attention to herself" immediately before detonating her device. An identity card recovered within the bus confirmed the identity of the suicide bomber as 30-year-old Naida Asiyalova and within hours of the explosion, a spokesman for the Investigative Committee of Russia named her husband, Dmitry Sokolov, as a prime suspect in the attack.

The explosive device consisted of two blocks of TNT weighing between 500 and 600 grams and two grenades (one of which failed to detonate in the explosion). In addition, Asiyalova had numerous shards of metal, screws, and bolts on her possession to maximize the devastation of the blast. Although one grenade had exploded when Asiyalova detonated her suicide belt, one unexploded grenade was discovered beneath the bus.

An investigation into Asiyalova's movements on the date of her death determined she had purchased a ticket to travel to Moscow via bus from Dagestan on the morning of 21 October, but had alighted the vehicle in Volgograd. Via an examination of CCTV footage, investigators determined Asiyalova had briefly entered a Volgograd shopping centre at 1:16 on the afternoon of her death, but had left the premises shortly thereafter before boarding the bus. As Asiyalova was found to have a ticket to travel to the capital on her possession at the time of the explosion, investigators believe the suicide attack was originally intended to take place at an unknown location in Moscow, although for unknown reasons, Asiyalova chose to detonate her device upon the bus. (Note: The fact Asiyalova had known Russian security agencies had been actively searching for her due to her known terrorism links may have led to her choosing to detonate her suicide belt upon the bus as opposed to travelling to Moscow to detonate her device.)

On the evening of the bombing, authorities within the Volgograd Oblast declared three days of mourning, commencing 22 October. The same day, the People's Republic of China condemned the bombing.

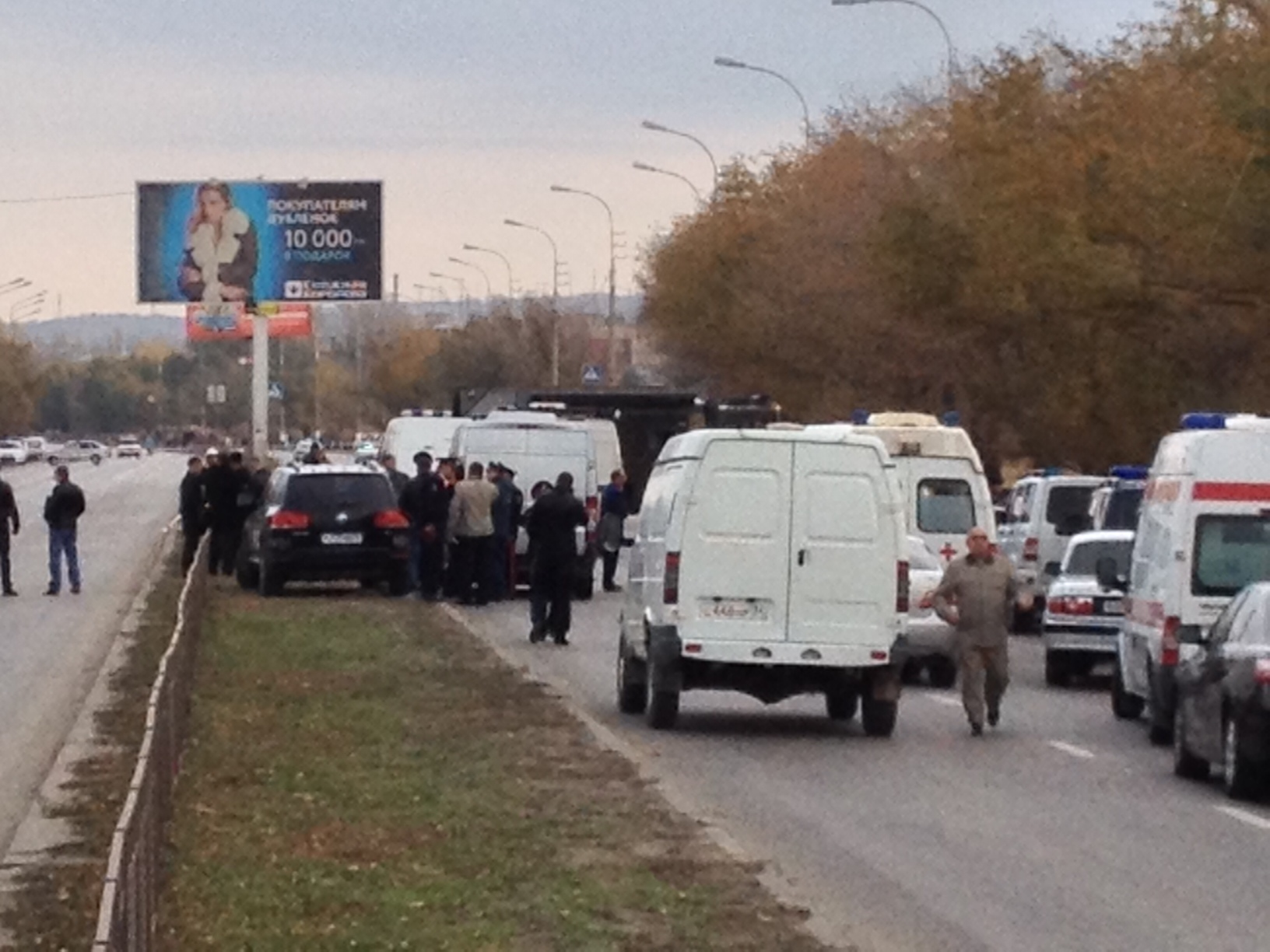
Emergency services converge at the scene of the bombing

== Perpetrators ==
=== Asiyalova ===
Asiyalova was born in the Gunibsky District of Dagestan in the North Caucasus on 25 October 1982. She was raised in the capital city of Makhachkala, and relocated to Moscow to work as a store clerk at age 23. Shortly after relocating to Moscow, Asiyalova married a Turkish man, although the couple divorced by mutual consent shortly thereafter.

She first encountered her future husband and co-conspirator in the Volgograd bus bombing, Dmitry Sokolov, on a Russian dating website in 2010 when she was a 27-year-old divorcée and he an 18-year-old recent convert to Islam. According to Asiyalova's mother, Ravzat, her daughter began developing a keen interest in Islamic extremism the year she encountered Sokolov and was already markedly radicalized—having adopted the name Amaturahman. (Note: According Asiyalova's mother, her daughter had not been a particularly religious child or adolescent. However, her daughter's increasing radicalization and insistence upon wearing a hijab led to frequent conflicts with her family, whom she saw little of in the final years of her life.) Shortly after becoming acquainted online, the two agreed to meet and began dating shortly thereafter.

At the time of Asiyalova's death, she is known to have suffered from a fatal bone disease which had begun causing her jawbone to recede. Resultingly, Asiyalova became increasingly dependent on both painkillers and tranquilizers. These factors may have influenced her decision to become a suicide bomber. (Note: Approximately three years before her death, acquaintances of Asiyalova had posted appeals on the Russian social network site VKontakte appealing for public donations to fund medical treatment for her malignant bone disease.)

=== Sokolov ===
Sokolov (b. 10 July 1992) was an ethnic Russian born into a family of Orthodox Christians. His family originally hailed from Krasnoyarsk, Siberia, although his family relocated to Moscow when he was in his teens. He is believed to have converted to Islam while studying in the capital and shortly before he met his future wife in 2010. Following his conversion to Islam, Sokolov adopted the name Abdul Jabbar and began studying Arabic.

Prior to Sokolov's marriage to Asiyalova, he is not known to have displayed any traits of extremism. However, in the months following their marriage, he converted to a more radical version of the faith. He was reported missing by his family in July 2012 after he failed to return home from the Arabic language courses he attended at a Moscow mosque. Although his mother, Olga, had subsequently appealed for information as to the whereabouts of her son and daughter-in-law on the Russian TV series Wait For Me, she received no response.

It is believed that following their marriage, Asiyalova persuaded Sokolov to convert to a more radical form of Islam—Wahhabism. She is also known to have persuaded him to join Islamic militants in her native Dagestan, where he became a prominent explosives expert. In the months prior to the Volgograd bus bombing, Sokolov had been linked to two separate, non-fatal explosions which had injured 29 people. Consequently, by October 2013, both he and his wife were on a list of Russia's most wanted fugitives.

== Death of Dmitry Sokolov ==
On 15 November 2013, Russian security forces located Dmitry Sokolov (then aged 21) in a private house in a village close to Makhachkala, Dagestan. Although authorities urged Sokolov and four other insurgents also hiding within the building to surrender—at one stage allowing Sokolov's mother to speak with her son via telephone in efforts to persuade him to end the siege peacefully—Sokolov and his accomplices refused to surrender to authorities. However, via mutual agreement with special forces, the woman and her 18-month-old daughter whose house the insurgents were hiding in were allowed to safely leave the premises during negotiations.

Prior to his death at the hands of Russian security services, Sokolov admitted within the telephone negotiations that he had constructed the suicide belt used in the Volgograd bus bombing with his wife's willing participation. He and his fellow insurgents were killed in a gunfight with the security services the following day. The Russian security forces suffered no casualties in the offensive.

== Victims ==
- Viktoria Koneva (20)
- Maksim Letkov (16)
- Kirill Litvinenko (18)
- Yelena Mikhailova (29)
- Maria Popadinets (18)
- Yulia Prikhodchenko (22)
- Tatyana Vereshchagina (59)

== See also ==
- Insurgency in the North Caucasus
- List of massacres in Russia
- List of Islamist terrorist attacks
- Second Chechen War
- Suicide attack
- Terrorism in Russia
