= P-40 radar =

Soviet early warning radar

P-40 Radar
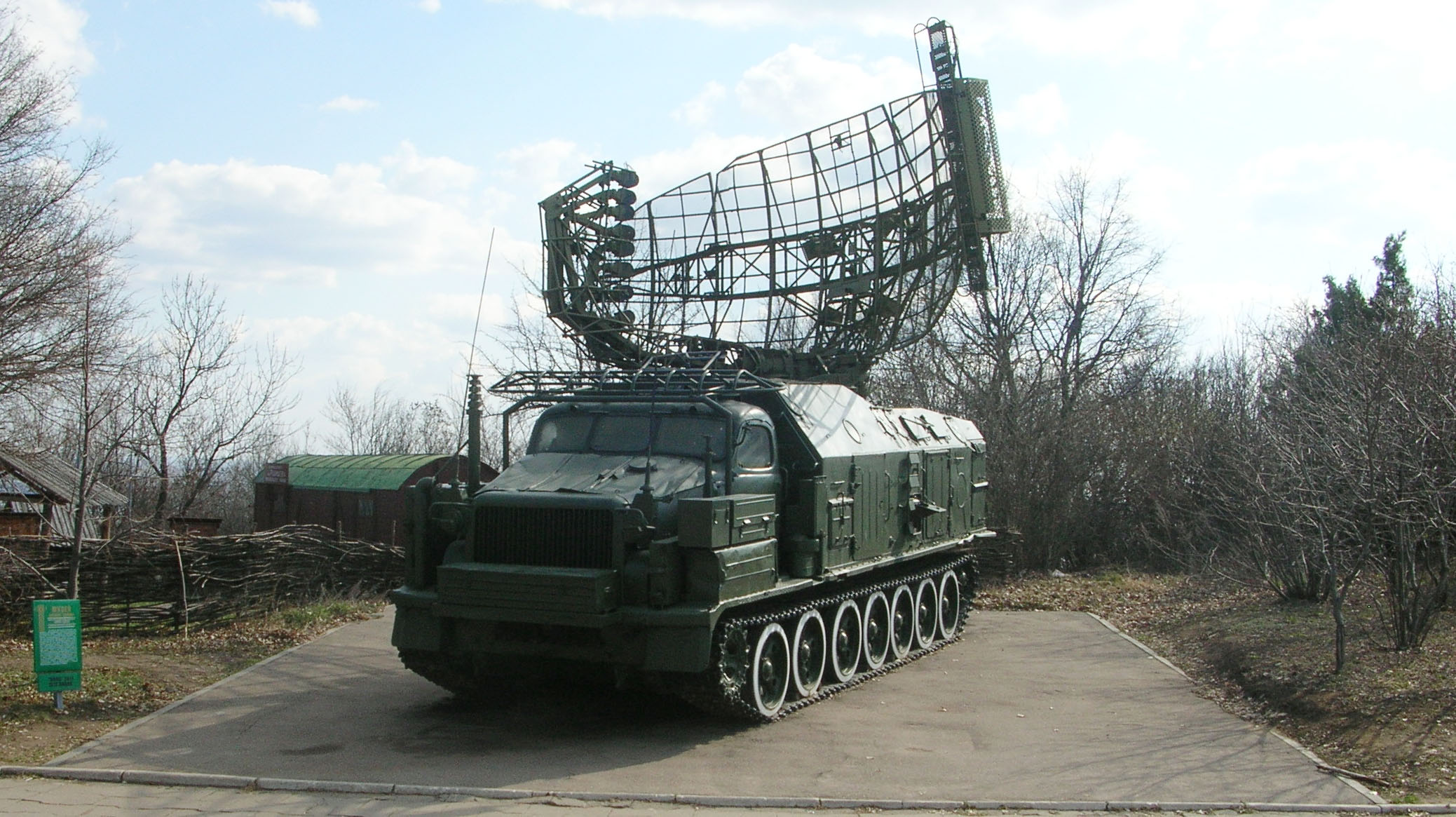
- P-40 radar at Park Pobedy, Saratov
- Country of origin: Soviet Union
- Introduced: 1963
- Type: Early Warning/Target Acquisition
- Frequency: Centimeter
- Range: 370 km (230 miles)
- Azimuth: 360 degrees
- Elevation: 2-14 degrees
- Power: 2 MW

The P-40 "Armour" or 1S12 (also referred to by the NATO reporting name "Long Track" in the west) is a 3-D UHF radar developed and operated by the former Soviet Union.

== Development ==
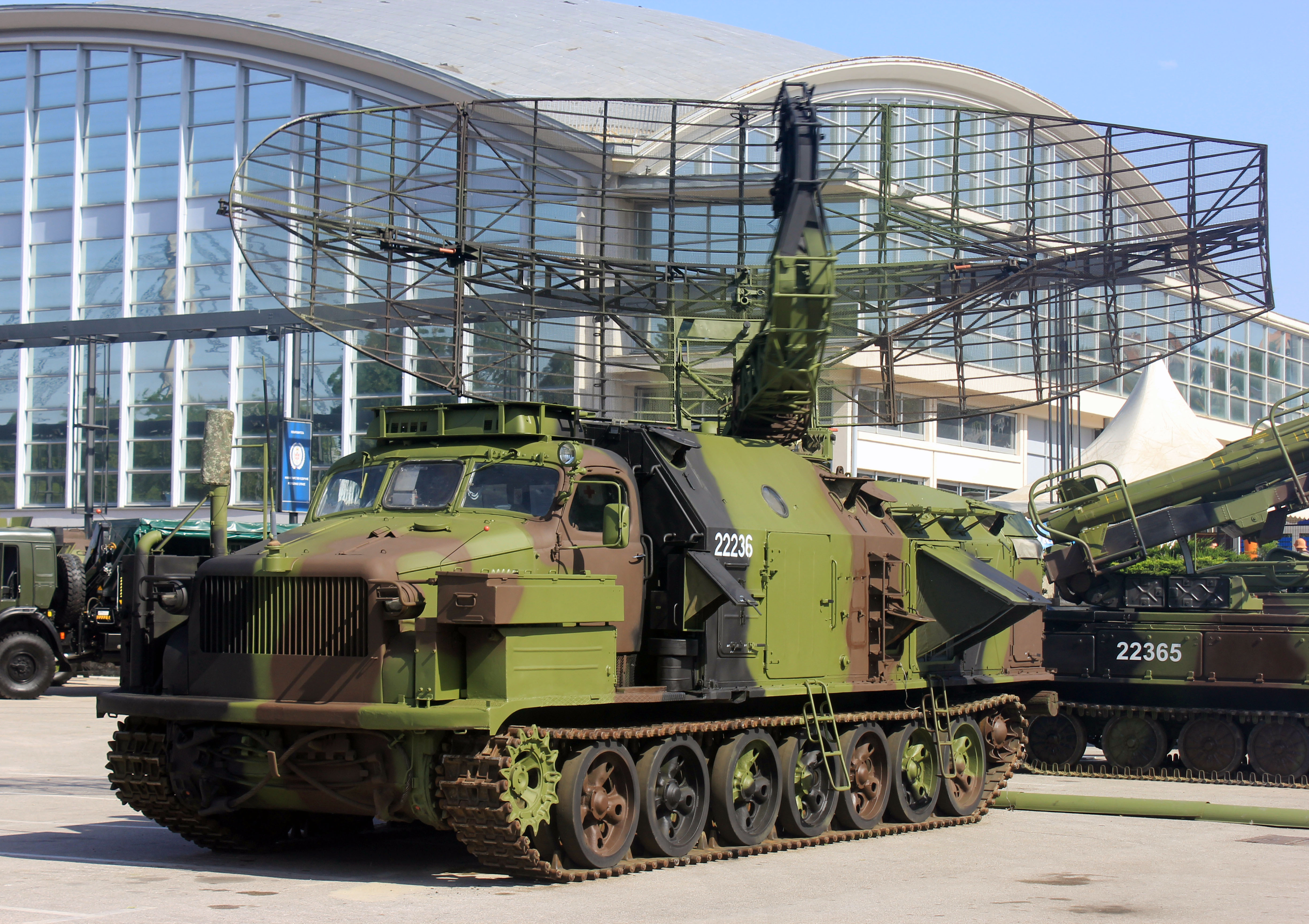
P-40 radar of the Serbian 250th Air Defense Missile Brigade.

The P-40 started development in 1960 and by 1962 the radar had completed state trials and in 1963 was accepted into service by the anti-aircraft troops of the Soviet armed forces.

In 1965 the P-40 gained the GRAU designation 1S12 as it was adopted as the target acquisition radar of the 2K11 Krug mobile anti-aircraft defence system. The main difference between P-40 and 1S12 is the additional "Telecode system" 1S62, with a telescope antenna at front right of chassis, to share data between 1S12 and 1S32.

The P-40 was developed by Scientific Research Institute #208 GKRE, which later became known as NIIIP of Minradioprom, OKB-588 (later Lianozovskiy Electromechanical Plant, LEMZ) also assisted in the production of the prototype.

Between 1966 and 1968 the radar was upgraded, increasing the range of the system. Later, between 1969 and 1970, the radar's range was again improved in addition to achieving better reliability.

== Description ==
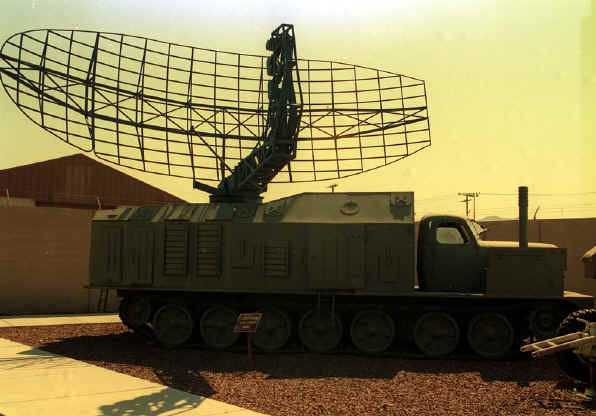
P-40 radar at Nellis AFB

The P-40 was the first high-mobility radar to enter into service with the then new tactical anti-aircraft forces of the Soviet armed forces.

The P-40 used the AT-T artillery tractor with tracked chassis, fitted with a 12-cylinder 4-stroke diesel engine with an output of 342 kW (465 hp) and producing a top speed of 55 km/h. The P-40 had a crew of 6 and a total weight of 35 tons, the radar being powered by a gas turbine running 400 Hz generator.

The radar uses an open frame truncated parabolic antenna with a stacked antenna feed. The radar antenna is mounted on the truck used to transport it giving excellent mobility; the radar is capable of being folded for stowage during transit. Azimuth was determined by mechanical scanning while the angle of the target is determined from within which beam of the antenna stack the target is detected. The radar does not carry a secondary antenna for IFF.

== Operators ==
=== Current operators ===
- Armenia
- Azerbaijan
- Bulgaria
- Kyrgyzstan
- North Korea
- Serbia
- Slovakia
- Turkmenistan
- Ukraine

=== Former operators ===
- Czechoslovakia
- East Germany
- Hungary
- Russia
- Soviet Union
- Yugoslavia
