= Fulger Battalion =

Special forces unit in Moldova

- Batalionul cu destinație specială „Fulger”
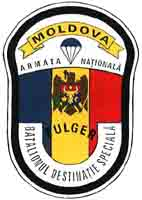
- Shoulder patch of the battalion
- Active: 1 November 1992 – present
- Country: Moldova
- Branch: Moldovan Ground Forces
- Type: Special forces
- Role: Search and rescue
- Garrison/HQ: Chișinău

The Independent Special Forces Battalion "Fulger" (Romanian: Batalionul cu destinație specială „Fulger”) is a military unit of the Land Forces of the Moldovan National Army, based in Chișinău.

== History ==
The battalion took the oath of allegiance to the Republic of Moldova on 1 November 1992. To date, the unit has participated in special missions in Iraq and been observers under the auspices of the United Nations in Liberia, Sudan and the Ivory Coast. The battalion has in recent years been criticized for not efficiently using their funding and resources allocated to them.

On its 27th anniversary in 2019, American Ambassador Dereck J. Hogan offered financial support to the unit while speaking at a ceremony hosted by the National Army Training Center, promising 3 million dollars to the contribution of the building of a new barracks and training rooms. Earlier that April, a team from the battalion was ranked first in the first crossfit championship organized in the National Army.

== Training ==
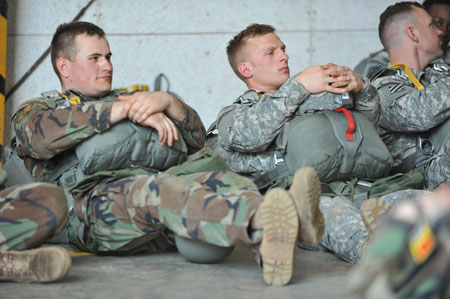
A member of the battalion training with a member of the 4th Battalion, 319th Field Artillery Regiment

The soldiers of the unit are trained in the field of special tactics, military topography, physical training, planning processes. At the same time, it learns advanced shooting techniques, being trained and patented as military paratroopers or the equivalent of the Russian Airborne Troops. The training program also includes the execution of a series of complex exercises, specific to the missions of special forces, such as alpine training, forcing watercourses, survival in severe conditions and medical-military training.

A group of service members from the battalion took part in the Joint Combined Exchange Training in the Romanian city of Buzău in late August 2016. At the exercise, called "Junction Strike 2016", soldiers of the battalion trained together with troops from Bulgaria, Poland, Portugal, Romania, the United States and Turkey.

== Commanders ==
- Ion Ojog (2015-2021)
