= Vickers Medium Dragon =

British artillery tractor

- Type: Tracked prime mover
- Place of origin: United Kingdom

Service history
- Used by: United Kingdom
- Wars: WW II (MK IV)

Specifications
- Main armament: none

The Vickers Medium Dragon was a fully-tracked British field artillery tractor made by Vickers (later Vickers-Armstrongs), produced in various versions from 1922 to 1937. The Medium Dragon towed a wide range of artillery, from 18-pounder field guns to BL 60-pounder heavy field guns. It was developed from the carrier version of a 'Tropical Tank' designed by Lt-Colonel Philip Johnson, using components from the running gear of the Vickers Medium Mark I tank.

The Mark I–III versions were purchased and used in quantity by the British Army at the start of its mechanisation of the artillery during the inter-war period. The Mark IV version of the Medium Dragon was effectively a complete re-design, using the running gear from the Vickers 6-ton tank, neither of which were adopted by the British Army. The Army decided in 1935 to purchase only wheeled artillery tractors, and no more were sold in the UK, but the Medium Dragon Mark IV sold well in export versions up to 1937.

From c. 1929 Vickers-Armstrongs also made the Light Dragon tractor for towing light artillery, with a similar name but of a completely different design based on the Vickers Light Tank Mk II.

== Design and development ==
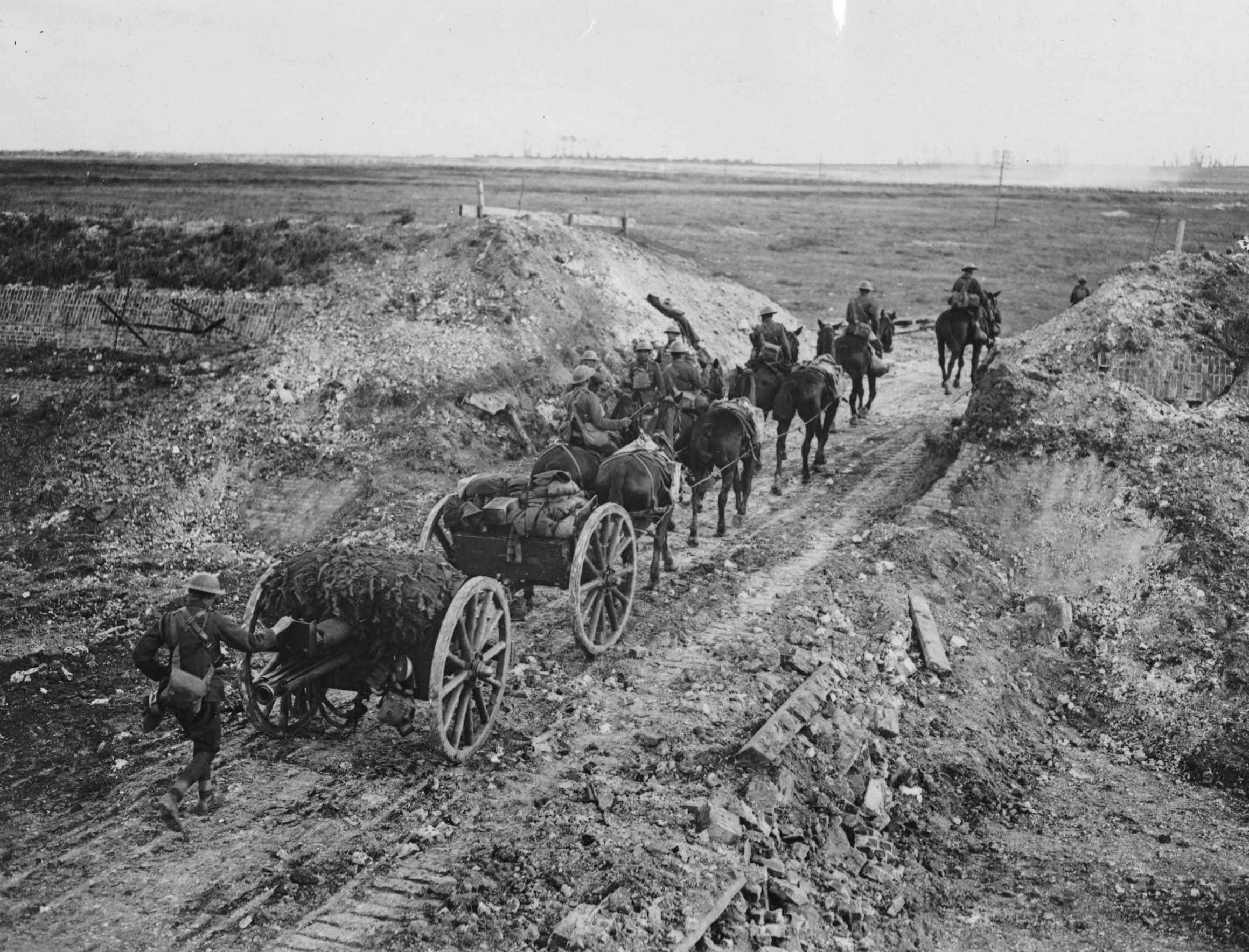
18-pounder field gun and its limber towed by six horses, 1918

Although there had been previous efforts to motorise heavy artillery transport during the First World War, such as the Holt tractor, the Gun Carrier Mark I and the Foster-Daimler Artillery Tractor to tow (in five loads) the BL 15-inch howitzer, the vast majority of British field artillery was still horse-drawn.

Major-general Sir Louis Jackson, formerly Director of Trench Warfare at the War Office, suggested in a lecture he gave in December 1919 that the army should organize the entirety of its transport on the basis of trucks; the infantry, artillery, and engineers should be carried in tracked tractors and cross-country trucks capable of transporting them swiftly and safely across the battlefield.

By late 1921 the War Office had begun the process of mechanising the Army's artillery. The United Service Gazette reported that "The War Office have given instructions for the four batteries of the 9th Brigade, Royal Field Artillery, now stationed at Deepcut, in the Aldershot Command, to be "mechanicalised" for the purpose of practical experiments. All the horses of the Brigade, except those of the officers, have been withdrawn and sent to the Remount Department. The personnel of the Brigade are now being trained to drive and to repair the kind of tractors to be used. It is understood that a tractor fitted with caterpillar tracks has been officially recommended for the trials, which are to take place shortly in the Aldershot Command. It is urged in favour of mechanical draught that it is economical in man power since the personnel of a battery might be reduced to approximately one half, when compared with one relying on horse draught."

Lt-Colonel Philip Johnson of the Tank Design Department had been involved in tank development since 1918. Early designs after the war included the Medium Mark D, including variants such as an amphibious tank capable of 25 mph (40 km/h). Another of Johnson's designs was a 'Light Infantry Tank', also based on the Medium Mark D. Johnson visited India in 1922 to see for himself the sort of requirements needed for a tank for the North-West Frontier. The trip resulted in a 7-ton 'Tropical Tank', together with a 'supply' (i.e. load-carrying) variant.

The engine, an Armstrong Siddeley air-cooled petrol V-8 of 90 hp (67 kW) was installed at the front on the left, with radiator intakes/louvres in the front panel (which were reproduced in the Mark I Dragon). It had rear wheel drive, like the Medium Mark A Whippet and Vickers Medium Mark I and Vickers Medium Mark II tanks.

The 9th (IX) Brigade Royal Field Artillery took delivery of the supply variant in August 1922: subsequently two more prototypes were built, named the Vickers Dragon Nos. 1 & 2 Artillery Tractor (experimental). While the Light Infantry and Tropical Tanks used a novel tensioned wire rope suspension, the prototype Dragons had conventional coil suspension based on that of the Vickers Medium Mark I, with eleven small road wheels and six return rollers. This system was carried into production.

Vickers began a limited production run in 1923, with the delivery of 18 Dragons Mark I, initially towing the Army's main field gun, the (84 mm) QF 18-pounder gun.

During 1923-4 the first two field artillery brigades were completely mechanized. At the same time the Royal Tank Corps, which had been placed on a permanent footing in September 1923, acquired its first Vickers Medium Tanks.

== Production history ==
The Medium Dragon was produced in four main versions, Marks I-IV.

=== Dragon Mark I ===
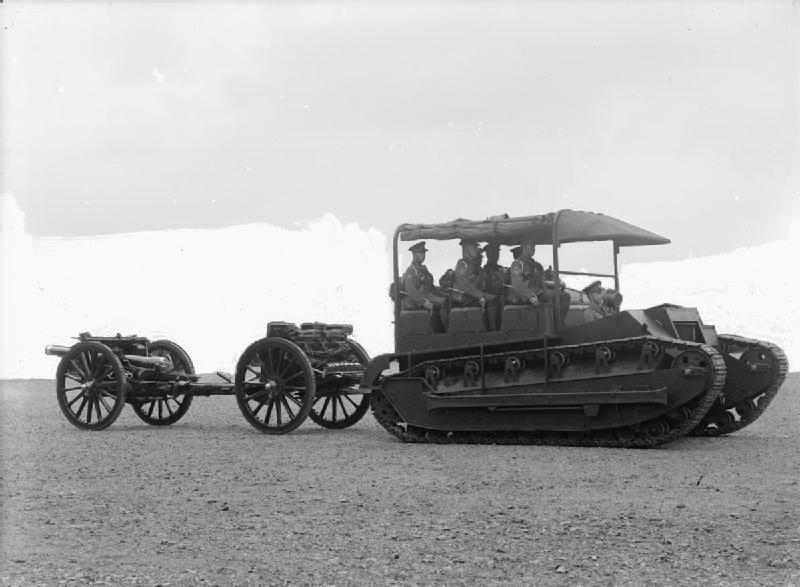
Medium Dragon Mark I towing an 18-pounder field gun and ammunition limber

11 road wheels, six return rollers, side skirt running the length of the tracks like Johnson's 'Tropical Supply Tank'.

The nine crew members sat on three rather exposed forward-facing benches, plus a commander and driver in front.

Two were converted by the Royal Ordnance Factory Woolwich for use by the RAF Armoured Car Company when the RAF took over responsibility and control of Mandatory Palestine, Trans-Jordan protectorate and parts of Iraq from 1922. The crew benches were removed, and an armoured body fitted with the turret from a Rolls-Royce armoured car. One was further transformed into a boxy armoured personnel carrier with rifle ports in the sides.

Experiments were also made with the Mark I Dragon to use it as a Bridge carrier, with a 30 ft (9.1 m) footbridge. The two detachable steel beams which were carried on the side skirts of the Mark I may have been connected with this. By 1926 a Vickers Medium tank had also been adapted to be a bridgelayer, but with only a 16-foot (4.9 m) light girder bridge, it was found to be of no practical use.

=== Medium Dragon Mark II ===
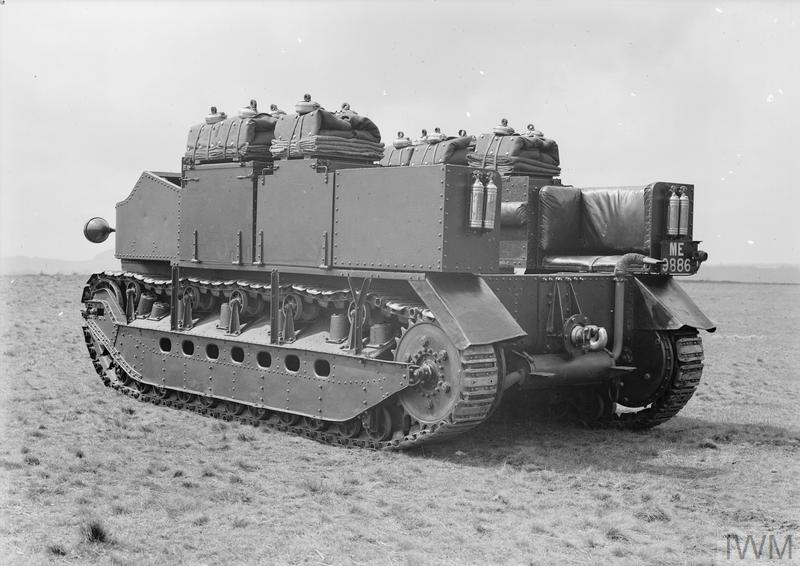
Medium Dragon Mark II*, three-quarter rear view

Distinguishing features include 11 road wheels (4 linked twin bogies, two separate wheels at the front, one at the rear), and five return rollers. The side skirt /mud chutes with 7 square holes, two vertical bars linking the side skirt to the main body. Headlights on stalks. Prominent upwards-facing triangular air intake in the centre of the front plate.

There was accommodation for eight men sitting sideways inside, plus two on rounded leather? seats at the rear aft of the ammunition boxes, plus a commander & driver at the front.

A Pathé News film shows King George V at Aldershot in c1923 watching Army exercises, including his inspection of a Medium Dragon Mk II.

The Medium Dragon Mark II* had some minor changes, including re-designed ammunition boxes.

=== Medium Dragon Mark III ===
The Mark III appeared in around 1929. The tracks had 11 road wheels (5 pairs flat on the ground and 1 single at the front), and six return rollers. The solid side skirt/mud chutes had four oblong holes. Five vertical bars linked the body to the side skirt. The headlights gained modern-looking faired housings. The air intake appears to be situated on the rh sloping front plate. Squared-off seats aft of the ammunition boxes at the rear of the body.

The Mark IIIB had modified mud chutes/sideskirts with three large oval holes and two smaller vertical oval ones at each end.

Data

- Weight: about 9 tons
- Engine: air-cooled Armstrong-Siddeley, same as in the Medium tanks.
- Speed: 16 mph (26 km/h)
- Capacity: 11 men
- Ammunition: 128 rounds of field gun ammo, stored in outwards-facing boxes with drop-down sides

The Mark IIIC had extra armouring apparently protecting the left-hand side crew. The headlight enclosures were squared-off, and the triangular engine cooling intake was turned downwards-facing on rh side front plate.

A 1942 US manual on the British Army shows a Medium Dragon Mark IIIC towing a 152 mm BL 6-inch 26 cwt howitzer.

=== Medium Dragon Mark IV ===
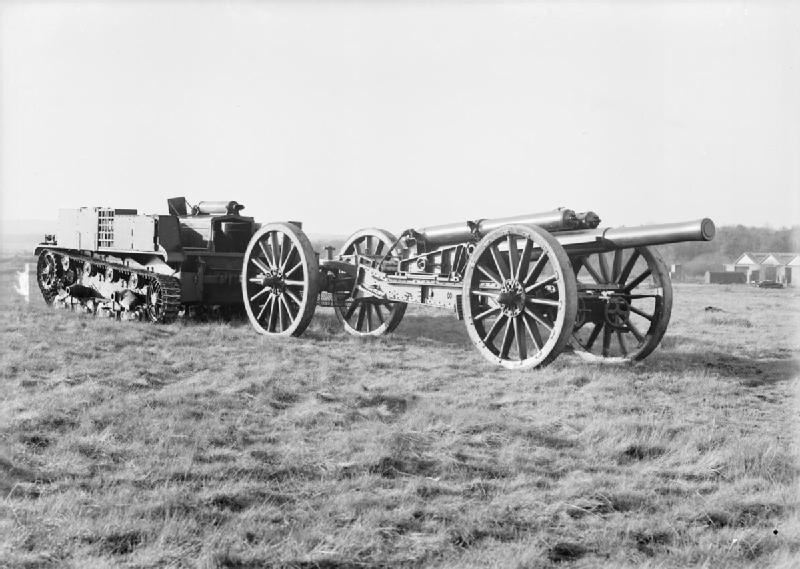
Medium Dragon Mark IV with 60-pounder gun

The Mark IV of c1932 was essentially a complete re-design, incorporating the running gear from the Vickers 6-ton Mark E: eight road wheels in two sets of paired bogies, quarter elliptical leaf spring suspension, and four return rollers. The side skirts on previous models were removed, leaving the running gear exposed. There was a distinctive shape to the tracks with the top run angled upwards towards the front.

Only twelve were sold to British Army in 1935, which adopted the official name of Dragon, Medium, Mark IV: some of these went to France with the BEF at the start of WWII. The UK versions were fitted with an AEC 6-cylinder inline water-cooled diesel engine as fitted to London buses (e.g. the AEC Q-type). Export versions were powered by an Armstrong-Siddeley Puma 4-cylinder petrol engine developing 91.5 bhp (68.2 kW).

In 1935 the Army decided to concentrate on using wheeled vehicles such as the Morris CDSW, and later the Morris C8 "Quad" and AEC Matador, for towing all the army's artillery, and the procurement of tracked artillery tractors was dropped. Nevertheless, Mark IIIC Medium Dragons were still being used in 1942.

Vickers exported considerably more Mark IVs (alongside 6-ton tanks) to foreign armies. 23 were sold to China in 1935 and India bought 18 tractors in 1937. In 1932 one vehicle was sold to the German company Siemens-Schuckert; in 1933 Finland bought 20, and the same year 26 Mark IVs in an anti-aircraft version were sold to the Siamese (Thai) Army, armed with a QF 2-pounder (40 mm) "pom-pom".

According to David Fletcher, the running gear of the Matilda I infantry tank was derived from the Mark IV Dragon. During trials of early Matildas in 1936 the track pins failed constantly until relative height of drive sprocket and wheels were changed, and the rubber-tyred road rollers (which were subject to considerable wear) were replaced with steel ones.

== Variants ==
According to:

- Dragon Mk I (1922) : First production vehicles used to tow 18-pdr (84 mm) gun and limber.
- Dragon Mk 1 [Light tank] : Experimentally fitted with a body, and turret of Rolls-Royce armoured car.
- Dragon Medium Mk I [Bridge carrier] : 30-foot (9.1 m) bridge carrier.
- Dragon Medium Mk II : 2nd version using components of the Vickers Medium tank.
- Dragon Medium Mk II* Modified Dragon II.
- Dragon Medium Mk II [Radio] : Experimental signals version.
- Dragon Medium Mk III (c1929)
- Dragon Medium Mk IIIA : Improved Mark III.
- Dragon Medium Mk IIIB : Modified sideskirts and mud chutes.
- Dragon Medium Mk IIIC : Revised engine air flow arrangements.
- Dragon Medium Mark IV : New version using components of the Vickers 6-ton tank.
