= MDK-2M =

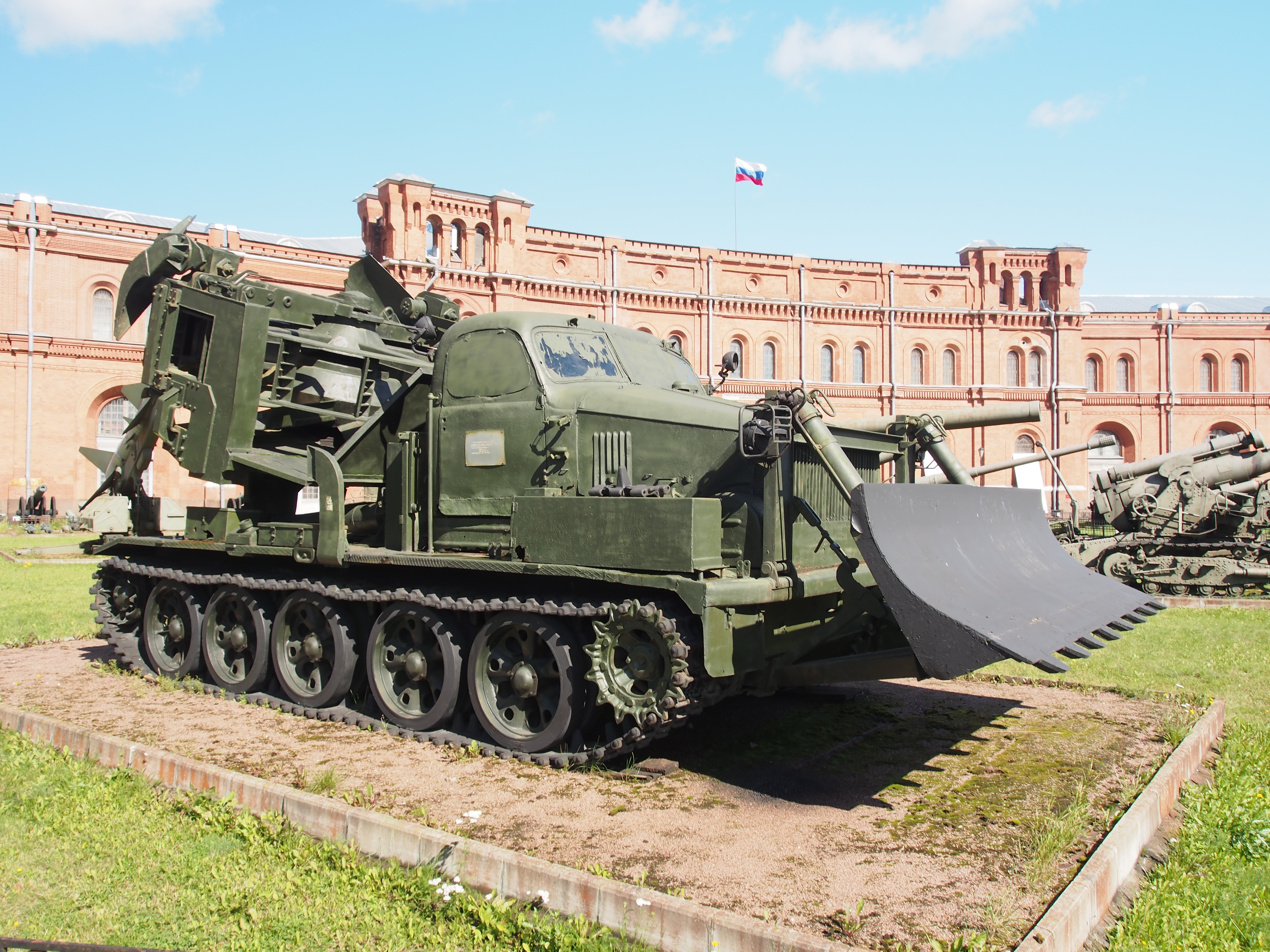
- An MDK-2.
- Type: Artillery tractor
- Place of origin: USSR

Specifications
- Mass: 4 tons
- Length: 7.043 meters
- Width: 3.17 meters
- Height: 3 meters
- Crew: 3
- Engine: Diesel; 415 HP
- Suspension: Torsion bar
- Operational range: 1100 km (on road)
- Maximum speed: 35 km/h

The MDK-2M was a Soviet Cold War era artillery tractor. It was based on the chassis of the AT-T, which itself is based on the chassis and drive system from the T-54 tank.

The MDK-2M was used for rapid digging of large coverages and for drawing tank trenches, with a digging depth up to 4.7 m width, and width 3.5 - 4m. The tiller is mounted on the rear of the vehicle, and is lifted hydraulically and stored in a raised position when not in use.

It was in service in the Soviet army, the Russian army, the East German army, and the Hungarian army.
