= ATS-59 =

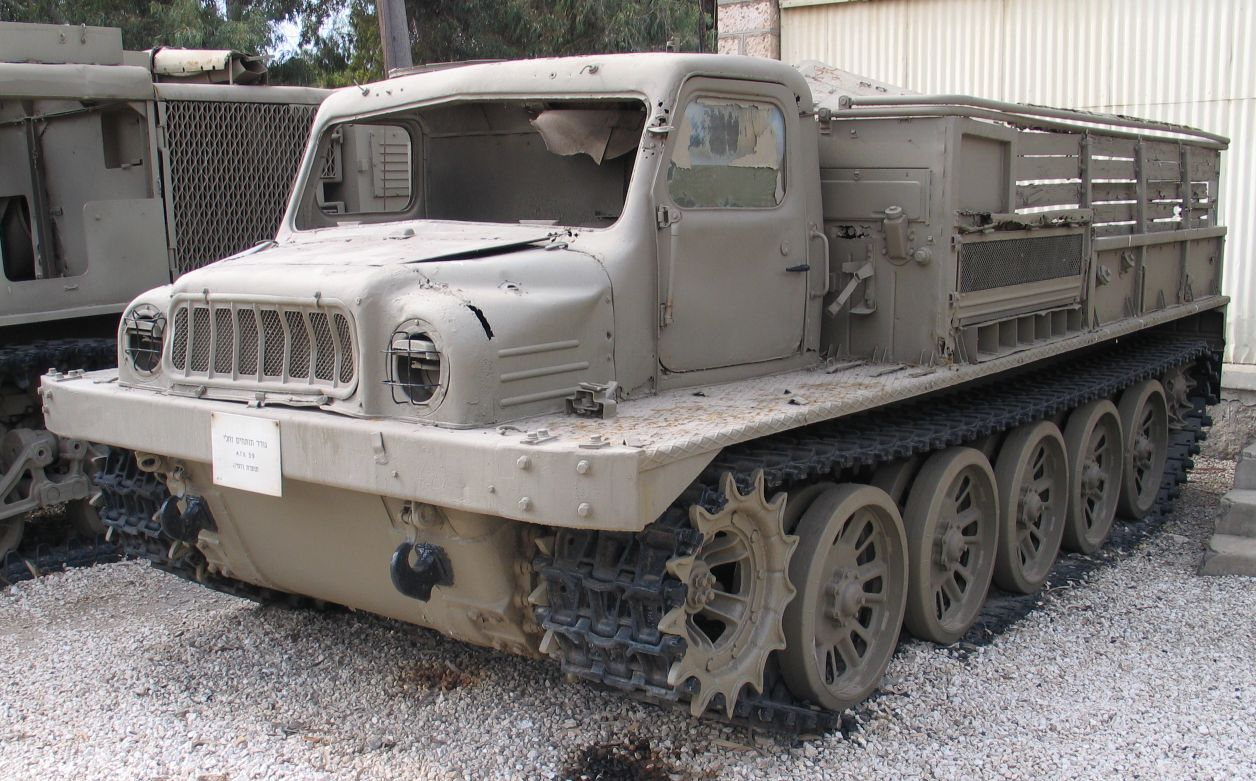
- On display in Batey HaOsef museum, Israel.
- Type: Artillery tractor
- Place of origin: Soviet Union

Service history
- Used by: See operators
- Wars: Vietnam War Russo-Ukrainian War

Production history
- Variants: See variants

Specifications (ATS-59)
- Mass: 13,000 kg (29,000 lb) (empty); 16,000 kg (35,000 lb) (loaded)
- Length: 6.28 m (20.6 ft)
- Height: 2.3 m (7 ft 7 in) (cab); 2.5 m (8 ft 2 in) (tarpaulin)
- Crew: 1+1
- Passengers: 14
- Engine: A-650 V-12 water-cooled diesel 300 hp (220 kW) at 1700 rpm
- Payload capacity: 3,000 kg (6,600 lb); 14,000 kg (31,000 lb) (towed load)
- Operational range: 350 km (220 mi); 500 km (310 mi) (with long range fuel tanks)
- Maximum speed: 39 km/h (24 mph)

Artilleriyskiy Tyagach Sredniy - 59, or ATS-59 (from Russian: Артиллерийский Тягач, Средний (АТС), meaning medium artillery tractor) is a Soviet Cold War era artillery tractor, currently in service with the Russian Army.

The ATS-59G has a larger cab seating 7 people in two rows. The T-55 tank engine was used and an overpressure NBC system was added. Otherwise the chassis and payload capacity remained unaltered.

The ATS-59 was developed as the successor for the AT-S. It retained the same payload and towing capability, but had a higher speed, longer range and improved off road capability.

== Variants ==
- ATS-59G − Improved variant with a redesigned cab
- S-75 tractor − A variant with the cargo bed removed and extra wheels fitted on the top of the rear chassis for towing the S-75 Dvina missile PR-11 semi-trailer transporter-launcher
- OST − Combat engineering variant with a hydraulically-operated dozer blade fitted in the front of the hull

== History ==
In April 2023, during the Russo-Ukrainian war, an armed specimen of an ATS-59G with a rear-mounted 25mm 2M-3M naval gun was photographed.

In July 2024, several units where spotted being transported to the front on a military train.

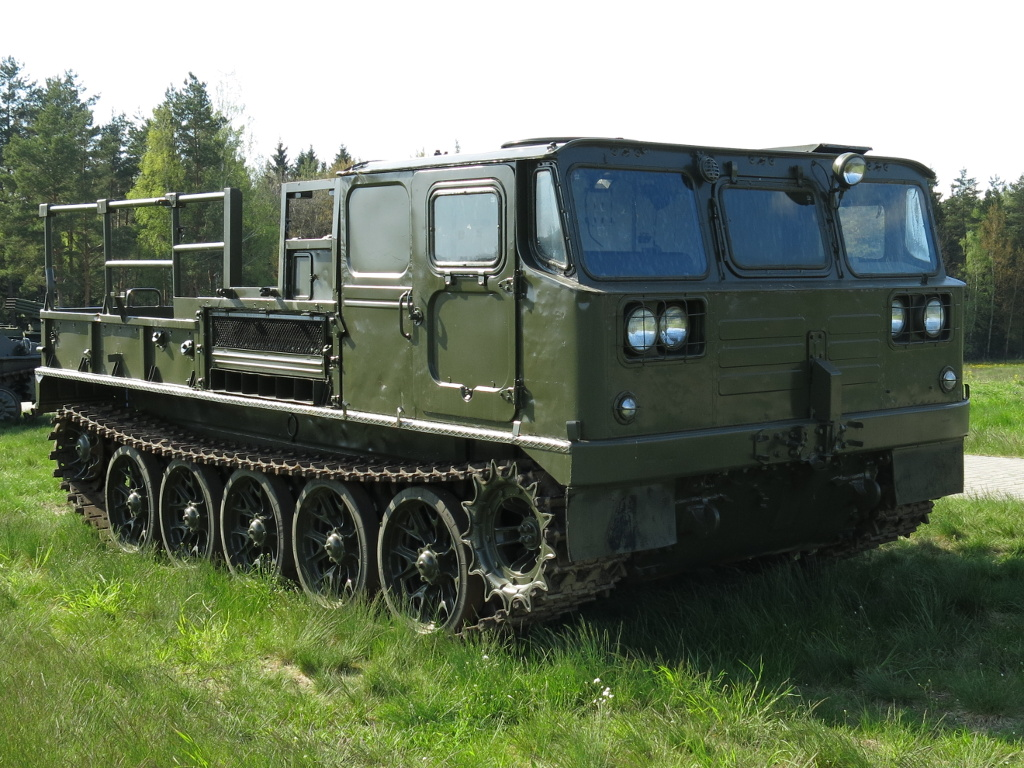
An ATS-59G

== Operators ==
- Cuba − ATS-59
- Czechoslovakia − 2,400 ATS-59G
- Egypt
- Finland − ~28 ATS-59
- North Korea
- Poland − Produced locally
- Romania
- Russia
- Soviet Union
- Ukraine
- Vietnam
- Yugoslavia
