= AT-T =

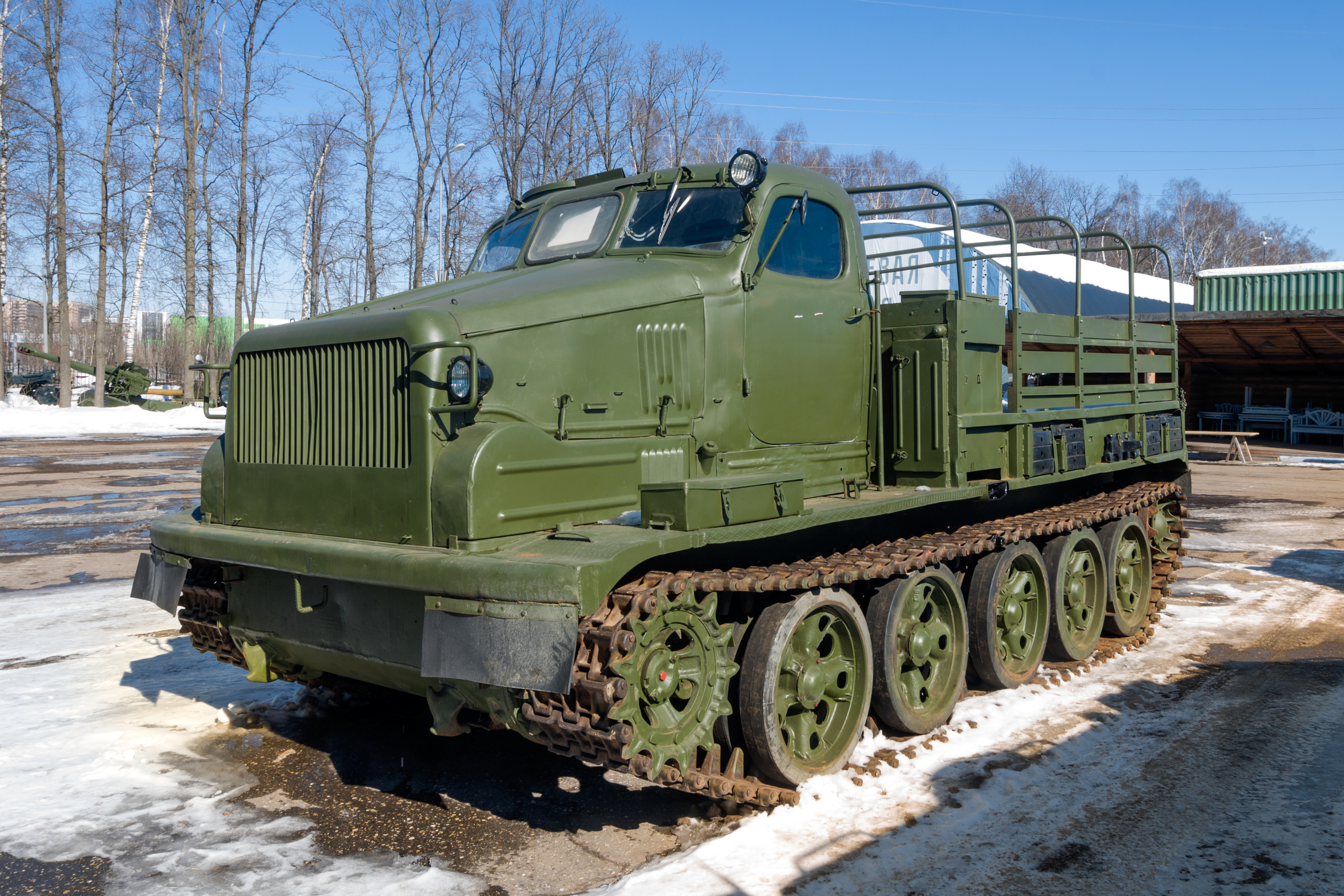
- Type: Artillery tractor
- Place of origin: USSR

Production history
- Designed: Mid-1940s
- Produced: 1947–1979

Specifications
- Mass: 20 tons
- Length: 7.043 m (23 ft 1.3 in)
- Width: 3.170 m (10 ft 4.8 in)
- Height: 3.000 m (9 ft 10.1 in)
- Crew: 18 maximum: 2 in front, 16 in rear
- Engine: diesel 415 hp (309 kW)
- Suspension: torsion bar
- Operational range: 1,100 km (680 mi) on road
- Maximum speed: 35 km/h (22 mph)

Artilleriyskiy Tyagach Tyazholiy, or AT-T (Russian: Артиллерийский Тягач, Тяжёлый (АТ-Т), meaning "heavy artillery tractor") is a Soviet Cold War-era artillery tractor. The AT-T is based on the chassis and drive system from the T-54 tank. However, the hull has been rotated 180 degrees, with the engine, clutch, gearbox, steering gear and drive wheels located at the front of the vehicle (on the tank, these are located to the rear). The crew cabin is also located in the front part of the vehicle with the cab is from the ZIS-150 and ZIL-164 trucks.

== History ==
With the adoption of new artillery and missile systems by the Armed Forces of the USSR, a post-war program was approved in the Soviet Union to develop a heavy tractor for transporting artillery and missile systems along with their ammunition, based on the T-54.

The Main Automobile Directorate set the following requirements for the new tractor:

- Towing artillery and missile systems and trailers with a mass of up to 25 tons (203-mm howitzers 203 mm howitzer M1931 (B-4), 130-mm anti-aircraft gun KS-30, super-heavy caliber guns, missile system R-12 Dvina) at speeds of up to 35 kilometers per hour in any climatic conditions of the USSR;
- Platform load capacity of at least 5 tons;
- Presence of a winch with a pulling force of at least 25 tons;
- The tractor chassis should allow the installation of special equipment for various branches of the military and specialized forces, with the capability to operate it;
- Potential use in civilian sectors.

At the end of 1947, the first prototypes of "Product 401" were produced at the Kharkiv Machine-Building Plant. For testing, a road run was conducted along the route from Kharkiv to Moscow (Kubinka). During the run, the tractor proved itself well as a powerful, durable, mobile, and operationally efficient machine with excellent towing capabilities, ease of use, and field maintenance. After comparative trials across a range of parameters, "product 401" turned out to be the most successful among all heavy artillery tractors of the first post-war generation. Its creators were awarded the Stalin Prize in 1948.

== Variants ==
- BAT-M obstacle removing vehicle
- BTM-3 high-speed trench digging vehicle
- Kharkovchanka Antarctic off-road vehicle
- MDK-2M pits digging vehicle
- P-40 radar

== Other ==
At the end of 1958, as part of the 4th Soviet Antarctic Expedition, the vehicles were delivered to Antarctica. On January 10, 1959, a convoy of all-terrain vehicles departed from Mirny Station. On December 26, 1959, a caravan consisting of two "Kharkovchanka" and an AT-T tractor reached the South Pole in the area of Amundsen–Scott Station.
