= 9TP =

WW2 Polish light tank

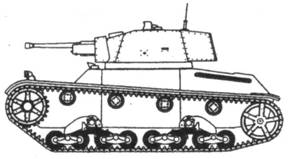
9TP

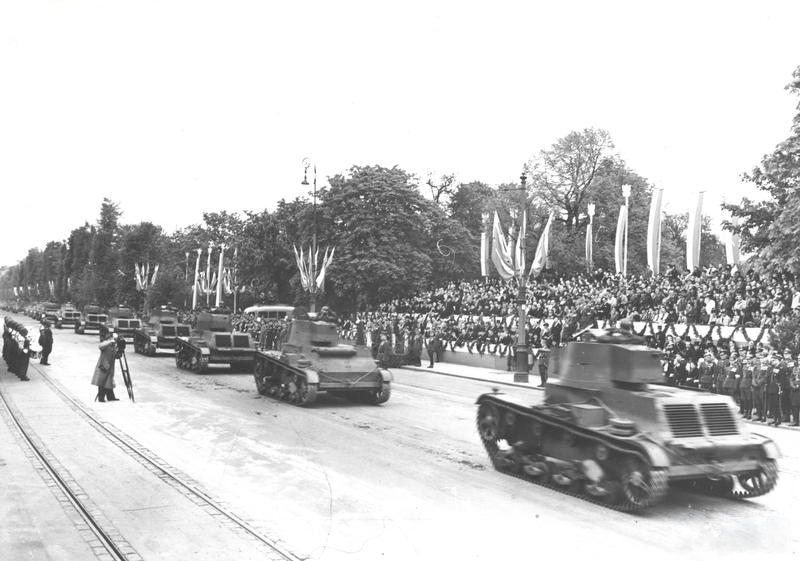
Early modified 7TP (second from the right) during a May 3rd Constitution Day parade in 1939

9TP (code for Polish: dziewięciotonowy polski - "9-tonne Polish") was a Polish light tank of early World War II era. A development of the earlier 7TP tank, it was to replace its predecessor in Polish service in 1940. Due to the outbreak of the war, only a limited number of early prototypes and development versions took part in battles of the Invasion of Poland.

The name of the tank was coined after World War II, technically the modified 7TP tanks were probably to retain the old designation regardless of the modifications. Alternative names include the "7TP wzmocniony", that is a "reinforced 7TP".

== Development ==
In the 1930s the Polish Army and the state-owned Państwowe Zakłady Inżynierii (PZInż) corporation worked on numerous modern medium tank designs that were to replace the 7TP as the main tank in Polish service, such as 10TP and 14TP. While 7TP was relatively modern and much superior to its German equivalents, the German Panzer I and Panzer II, it was based on the ageing Vickers 6-Ton and it was clear that it had limited potential for further improvements. However, as the 10TP and 14TP projects were running behind schedule, in 1938 it was decided to improve on the existing design.

The first modification was a new, more powerful powertrain. The new design could use either the Saurer CT1D diesel engine (license-produced in Poland as PZInż 155) or a modern gasoline engine PZInż 725. Both engines were lighter and smaller than the Saurer VBLDd engine used in 7TP. Because of that the armour could be extended and more space could be redirected to the battle compartment. An additional bonus was that both engines were water-cooled which allowed for the rear grille of 7TP to be replaced with solid armoured plates. Another modification planned for the 9TP was switching from bolted and screwed to welded armoured plates, which further strengthened the hull and allowed to save additional 210 kilograms, enough to further strengthen the armour and widen the tracks from 267 mm to 320 mm.

Two design teams were tasked to work on the upgrade package. A design team of the PZInż led by Edward Habich decided to use the Saurer CT1D engine and introduce the design improvements gradually at the production lines. In May 1938 the PZInż produced one of the 7TP tanks (hull number 1766) equipped with the new CT1D engine and rear armoured plates. In the autumn of the same year the new tank was tested by the Centre for Armoured Troops Training at Modlin Fortress.

Simultaneously a design team of the Technical Research Bureau of Armoured Forces (BBTBP) adopted the PZInż 725 engine and decided to further modify the tank, lowering its silhouette. While the BBTBP design was considered superior to the one proposed by PZInż, eventually the PZInż proposals were accepted as requiring less work and time to introduce in serial production.

== Production and service ==
On 29 June 1939 the Polish Army ordered 100 tanks of the new design to be delivered by June 1940. The following month the PZInż produced two additional prototypes to be extensively tested at tank proving grounds. While tests were generally favourable, it was noted that the new design had much lower speed than had been anticipated (26 km/h on paved roads and 11.5 km/h off-road).

It is unclear how many 9TP tanks were actually produced before the outbreak of World War II on 1 September 1939. It is assumed that the 11 tanks delivered to the Polish Army already after the start of hostilities were of 9TP rather than 7TP design. If this was the case, than the total number of 9TP tanks produced was 13 (two prototypes and 11 production models), with one 7TP with a new engine being an interim design. No documentation has survived however and this is by no means certain. The 11 tanks could have been either standard 7TP or 7TP with some of the modifications included, but not all of them. The tanks of this batch were incorporated in the 2nd Light Tank Company and took part in the battles during the Siege of Warsaw and served with distinction until the capitulation of the city on 27 September 1939.
