= 10TP =

1930s Polish cruiser tank prototype

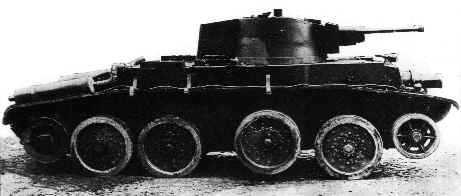
- Type: Light tank
- Place of origin: Poland

Service history
- In service: 1938-1939 (prototype)
- Used by: Polish Army

Specifications
- Mass: 12.8 tons
- Length: 5.4 m (17 ft 9 in)
- Width: 2.55 m (8 ft 4 in)
- Height: 2.2 m (7 ft 3 in)
- Crew: 4
- Armor: 8-20 mm (hull); 16 mm (turret)
- Main armament: 1× 37 mm Bofors wz. 36 (anti-tank gun)
- Secondary armament: 2× 7.92 mm Ckm wz.30 (heavy machine gun)
- Engine: 12-cylinder American LaFrance engine 210 hp (160 kW)
- Transmission: 5-speed gearbox
- Suspension: Christie
- Ground clearance: 40 cm (16 in)
- Fuel capacity: 130 l
- Operational range: 210 km (130 mi) on roads 130 km (81 mi) off-road
- Maximum speed: 50–75 km/h (31–47 mph)

The 10TP was a Polish light cruiser tank that never progressed beyond the prototype stage. Though intended to contribute to the Polish armour development programme, the prototype was ultimately deemed unsuccessful. However, insights gained during testing informed the design of the subsequent 14TP model, which was never completed due to the outbreak of World War II.

The 10TP prototype featured an original design that incorporated some of the general concepts pioneered by J. Walter Christie, alongside numerous innovative technical solutions developed by Polish engineers.

== History ==
In the late 1920s, the Polish Armed Forces identified a need for a new tank design. The Wojskowy Instytut Badań Inżynierii (WIBI), or "Military Engineering Research Institute", dispatched Captain Ruciński to the United States to legally acquire a Christie M1928 tank, along with its blueprints and a licence for production. This tank was intended to serve as the basis for a new Polish light tank. However, the Poles never received the machine. Fearing legal complications, Christie refunded the purchase.

Due to the failure to acquire the master model and its associated licence, the WIBI Tank Design Bureau began preliminary design work on its own wheeled/tracked tank in late 1930. This design was inspired by the American Christie M1928 and M1931 tanks, and was given the working name "A la Christie".

The design work was based on available data, including advertising brochures, notes, and sketches that Captain Ruciński had obtained from Christie. By 1932, design drawings and a parts list were completed. However, work soon slowed down as the designers were tasked with evaluating a newly purchased British Vickers Mark E tank. This evaluation ultimately led to the development of the Polish 7TP light tank.

In late 1934, the liquidation of the WIBI and the establishment of the Armoured Forces Design and Testing Centre under the direct command of the Armoured Forces Command led to the destruction of most documentation for the "A la Christie" project by a special commission. Only a handful of handwritten notes and calculations survived.

On 10 March 1935, design work began on a new tank model designated 10TP. Major Rudolf Gundlach led the design team, which included engineers Jan Łapuszewski, Stefan Ołdakowski, Mieczysław Staszewski, Kazimierz Hejnowicz, and process engineer Jerzy Napiórkowski.

In 1936, the 10TP tank design was still under development, but it was nonetheless included in the Polish Army's modernisation programme for 1936-1942. This programme, encompassing armoured forces, was approved by the Armament and Equipment Committee (Komitet do spraw Uzbrojenia i Sprzętu, KSUS) in January 1936. The 10TP was listed as the intended equipment for four tank battalions within new motorised units.

Assembly of the first 10TP prototype began in 1937 at the Experimental Workshop (WD) of the State Engineering Plants (PZInż.) Factory in Ursus, near Warsaw. This factory served as the central production site for Polish tanks during 1931-1939. Captain Kazimierz Grüner oversaw the construction. Coinciding with the prototype's development, two motorised cavalry brigades were formed, intended to be equipped with the 10TP once operational.

Construction of the 10TP tank was completed in July 1938. The extended development time stemmed from the need to acquire essential components not manufactured in Poland, such as a sufficiently powerful engine, from foreign sources. On 16 August, the 10TP undertook its first extended test drive. Sergeant Polinarek, an experienced military specialist, piloted the tank under the direct supervision of Captain Leon Czekalski, Chief of the Trial and Experiment Department within the Bureau of Technical Studies on Armoured Weapons (Biuro Badań Technicznych Broni Pancernych, BBT Br.Panc.). The trials were conducted in secrecy due to the escalating activities of German Abwehr intelligence and suspected infiltration by the "Fifth Column" in Poland.

Further trials were halted due to minor faults until 30 September. The tank was then sent to the WD for design modifications.

On 16 January 1939, the tank underwent supervised testing with a short trip to Łowicz. In spring, it completed a longer journey beyond Grodno, covering a total distance of 610 kilometres (380 mi) between 22 and 25 April. After logging nearly 2,000 kilometres (1,200 mi) during these trials, the vehicle returned to the WD for a thorough inspection. This involved a near-complete disassembly to assess wear on components, identify causes of malfunctions, and effect repairs.

In May, the refurbished tank was presented to generals and other high-ranking military officials.

The designers, after analysing their experiences, concluded that a tank of this type should be a purely tracked vehicle. Any equipment needed for a wheeled driving mode was deemed redundant weight. Eliminating this weight allowed them to significantly increase the armour thickness while maintaining the vehicle within the original weight limit. The next stage of development for the 10TP was the 14TP tank. Development commenced in late 1938 but was not completed due to the outbreak of World War II.

Before series production could begin, the German invasion of Poland in September 1939 brought an end to the independent existence of the Second Polish Republic.

== Design ==
The 10TP's wide hull accommodated a two-man turret and allowed for two crew members to sit side-by-side in the front compartment. The designers adopted the American Christie suspension system concept, enabling the vehicle to travel on both wheels and tracks. However, they developed their own wider tracks, drive sprockets, and track-linking mechanisms. The 10TP also featured an advanced hydraulic servomechanism steering system, a domestic innovation that significantly impacted the tank's overall performance.

== See also ==
- Gundlach tank periscope
- List of armoured fighting vehicles of World War II
- BT series (Similar Soviet tank design)
