= Bofors 37 mm anti-tank gun =

1930s towed 37 mm anti-tank gun

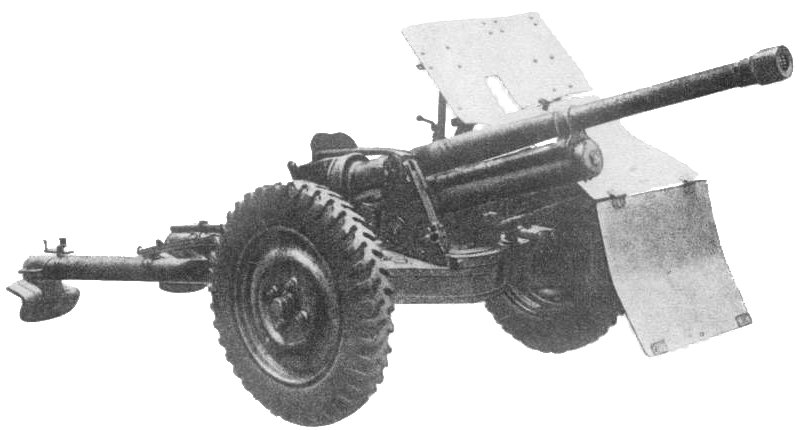
- Polish wz. 36 anti-tank gun.
- Type: Anti-tank gun
- Place of origin: Sweden

Service history
- Used by: See Operators
- Wars: Spanish Civil War; Winter War; World War II; Continuation War

Production history
- Designed: 1934
- Manufacturer: Bofors
- Produced: 1934–?

Specifications
- Mass: 370 kg (816 lbs)
- Length: 3.04 m (10.0 ft)
- Barrel length: 1.6 m (5 ft 3 in) (45 calibers)
- Width: 1.09 m (3 ft 7 in)
- Height: 1.03 m (3 ft 5 in)
- Shell: Fixed QF 37×258 mm R
- Shell weight: .74 kg (1 lb 10 oz)
- Caliber: 37 mm (1.45 in)
- Breech: vertical sliding-block
- Carriage: split trail
- Elevation: -10° to 25°
- Traverse: 50°
- Rate of fire: 12 rounds per minute
- Muzzle velocity: 800–870 m/s (2,625-2,854 ft/s)
- Effective firing range: 4,000 m (4,374 yds)
- Maximum firing range: 6,500 m (7,108 yds)

The Bofors 37 mm anti-tank gun was an anti-tank gun designed by Swedish manufacturer Bofors in the early 1930s originally for Swedish use. It was exported to several countries during the 1930s of which several bought licences to produce it themselves. The gun was used in several conflicts but most of its fame comes from its use in the Spanish Civil War and the Winter War where it was used very successfully against light tanks and armored cars among other targets. Beyond its use as an infantry gun it was also used as the main armament in several armored cars and tanks such as the Dutch M39 Pantserwagen and the Polish 7TP to name a few. As the armor of tanks was increased during World War II the gun very quickly became obsolete as an anti-tank gun but was still used effectively as an infantry support gun for the entirety of the war, and well into the Cold War. This was due to its high fire rate, great mobility and effective high explosive shells.

== Development history ==
The gun was initially designed by Swedish manufacturer Bofors, mainly for export purposes. It was likely derived from Rheinmetall's 3,7-cm Tak, the predecessor of 3.7 cm Pak 36. The first prototype was built in 1932; the development process continued until 1934. The Netherlands were the first to purchase the gun (order for 12 pieces was placed in 1935) and were followed by many other countries. Licensed copies were produced in Denmark, Finland, the Netherlands and Poland.

The barrel was of monobloc type, with semi-automatic vertical sliding breech block and small muzzle brake. It was mounted on a split trail carriage which had suspension and metal wheels with rubber tires. To give the crew some protection from firearms and shell fragments, the gun was equipped with a 5 mm thick shield, with a folding lower plate.

== Operational history ==
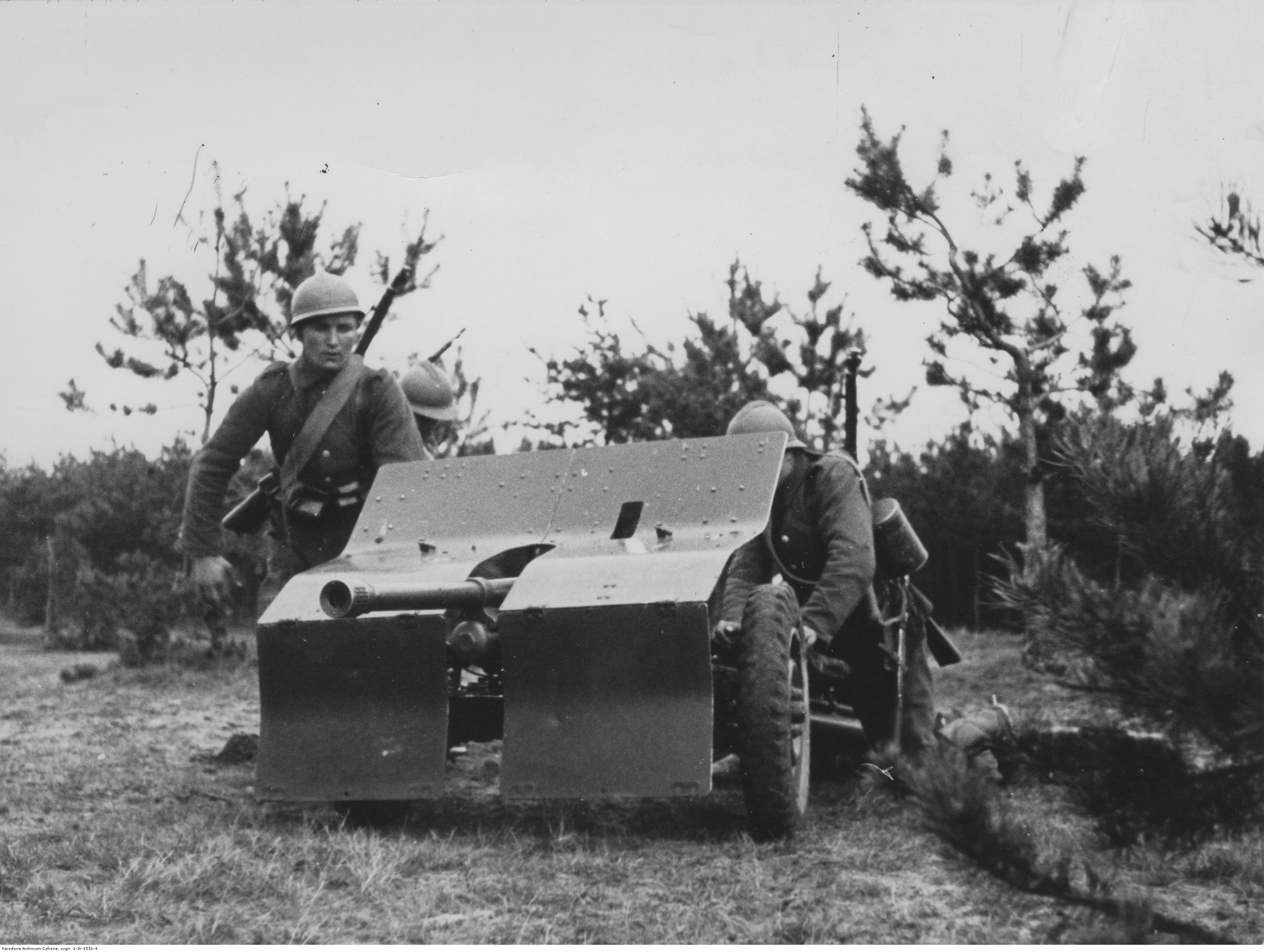
Polish artillerymen prepare their firing position with the wz. 36 Bofors gun in training, 1939.

The Bofors gun saw combat for the first time in Spanish Civil War, where it could easily pierce the armor of contemporary light tanks. The Polish guns were actively used during the German and Soviet invasion of Poland in 1939. Volhynian Cavalry Brigade equipped with the Bofors 37 mm antitank gun beat the German Panzer Divisions in one of the first battles of the invasion; the Battle of Mokra. At that time, the armored forces of the Wehrmacht consisted mainly of light Panzer I and Panzer II tanks, which were vulnerable to the Bofors gun. Early models of the Panzer III and Panzer IV could also be penetrated at ranges up to 500 m. After Poland was occupied, most of the guns fell into the hands of the German and Soviet armies. The weapon was proven obsolete by 1941 during Operation Barbarossa.

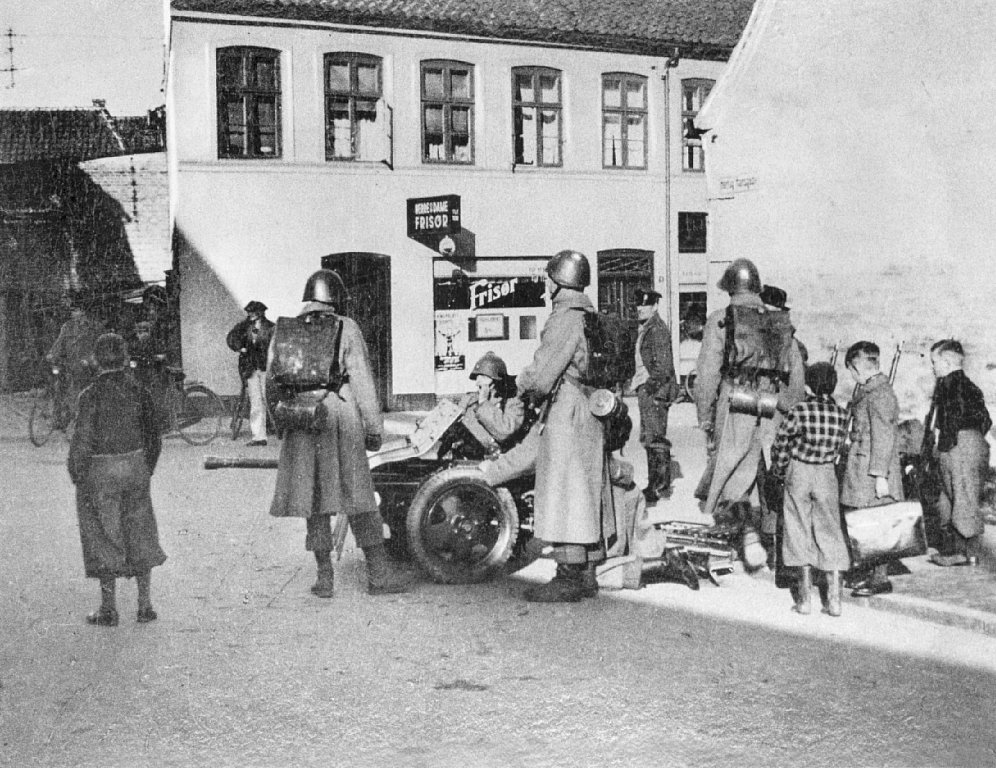
A Danish gun with its crew during the Invasion of Denmark, 9 April 1940, two of the crew were later killed

Even though only one Bofors AT-gun was in action in the invasion of Denmark, it damaged two tanks, and shot the tracks off another tank, before its crew were either wounded or killed by a German tank destroyer which drove over the gun. The gun is now at the Tøjhusmuseet in Copenhagen.

During the Winter War, the Finnish guns were successfully used against Soviet tanks such as T-26, T-28 and BT. However, in the Continuation War the gun was found to be ineffective against the T-34 and KV and was relegated to an infantry support role.

The gun was used to equip the British forces in North Africa, where it made up for the lack of the QF 2-pounder anti-tank guns after the Fall of France. It was often carried portee on the back of a vehicle.

Bofors guns were also employed in World War II by Germany, the Netherlands, Romania, Yugoslavia and USSR, but there are no detailed reports of their use.

== Summary ==
When it was introduced, the Bofors 37 mm anti-tank gun was an effective weapon and an international success, able to deal with contemporary tanks. Its performance, light weight and high rate of fire made it a popular anti-tank weapon in the pre-war Europe. Introduction of better armored tanks early in World War II, however, made the gun obsolete (as with other similarly performing weapons such as the German 3.7 cm Pak 36 and the United States 37 mm Gun M3).

== Ammunition ==
There were many different ammunition types available for the Bofors 37 mm at gun. It could fire all common types of ammunition and some rare types such as APDS and white phosphorus incendiary.

Swedish ammunition
Designation	Type	Projectile			Power	Muzzle-Vo
Designation	Type	Core	Weight	Propellant weight (kg NC 1245)	Power	Muzzle-Vo
37 mm sk ptr m/34 slpprj m/38	AP-T	–	0.735 kg	0.205 kg	330; MPa	785 m/s
37 mm sk ptr m/34 slpgr m/39	APHE-T	15 grams of Trotyl	0.740 kg	0.217 kg	280; MPa	775 m/s
37 mm sk ptr m/34 slpprj m/49	APDS-T	24 mm dart				1150 m/s
37 mm sk ptr m/34 sgr m/43	HE	95 grams of Trotyl	0.680 kg	0.210 kg	330 MPa	805 m/s
37 mm sk ptr m/34 slövnprj m/38	P-AP-T	Spotting charge	0.728 kg	0.213 kg	280 MPa	790 m/s
37 mm sk ptr m/34 övngr m/34	P-HE	Spotting charge	0.660 kg	0.220 kg	330 MPa	810 m/s

Swedish ammunition penetration performance
Designation	Type	Performance							
Designation	Type	Power	Muzzle-Vo	Penetration					
Designation	Type	Power	Muzzle-Vo	@ 0° from normal	Impact-Vo	@ 30° from normal	Impact-Vo	@ 45° from normal	Impact-Vo
37 mm sk ptr m/34 slpprj m/38	AP-T	330; MPa	785 m/s	55 mm (at 200 m) – – – –	739 m/s – – – –	45 mm (at 200 m) 40 mm (at 400 m) 35 mm (at 600 m) 32 mm (at 800 m) 29 mm (at 1000 m)	739 m/s – – – –	33 mm (at 200 m) 30 mm (at 400 m) 27 mm (at 600 m) 24 mm (at 800 m) 22 mm (at 1000 m)	739 m/s – – – –
37 mm sk ptr m/34 slpgr m/39	APHE-T	280; MPa	775 m/s	– –	– –	39 mm (at 100 m) 30 mm (at 900 m)	– –	– –	– –
37 mm sk ptr m/34 slpprj m/49	APDS-T		1150 m/s	– – – – – –	– – – – – –	70 mm (at 0 m) 65 mm (at 200 m) 62 mm (at 400 m) 58 mm (at 600 m) 55 mm (at 800 m) 52 mm (at 1000 m)	1130 m/s 1100 m/s 1060 m/s 1030 m/s 1000 m/s 970 m/s	– – – – – –	– – – – – –

== Operators ==
Denmark
A version with slightly more powerful cartridge was manufactured by the Danish state arsenal Hærens Vaabenarsenal in 1936-37 as 37 mm fodfolkskanon M. 1934. In 1945 Danish units returning to their homeland brought with them a few Swedish model 1938 guns.
Finland
As 37 PstK/36. 114 pieces were bought from Bofors in 1938–39 (some of them were returned to Sweden in 1940), 42 Polish-made guns were received from Germans in 1940–41 and 355 were produced by local manufacturers Tampella and VTT (Valtion Tykkitehdas – State Artillery Factory) in 1939–41. When the Winter War began in November 1939, the Finnish Army had 98 guns of the type. A tank version was also used to equip Finnish 6-tonne tanks. The gun remained in the Finnish Army inventory listings until 1986.
Germany
Used Polish guns captured in 1939 as 3,7 cm PaK 36(p) and Danish guns captured in 1940 as 3,7 cm PaK 157(d).
Netherlands
12 pieces were ordered from Bofors in 1934. Later another 24 (or more) were procured. All these were used for Dutch armoured cars: 24 Landsverk types L180 and L181 as well as 12 DAF Pantrado cars.

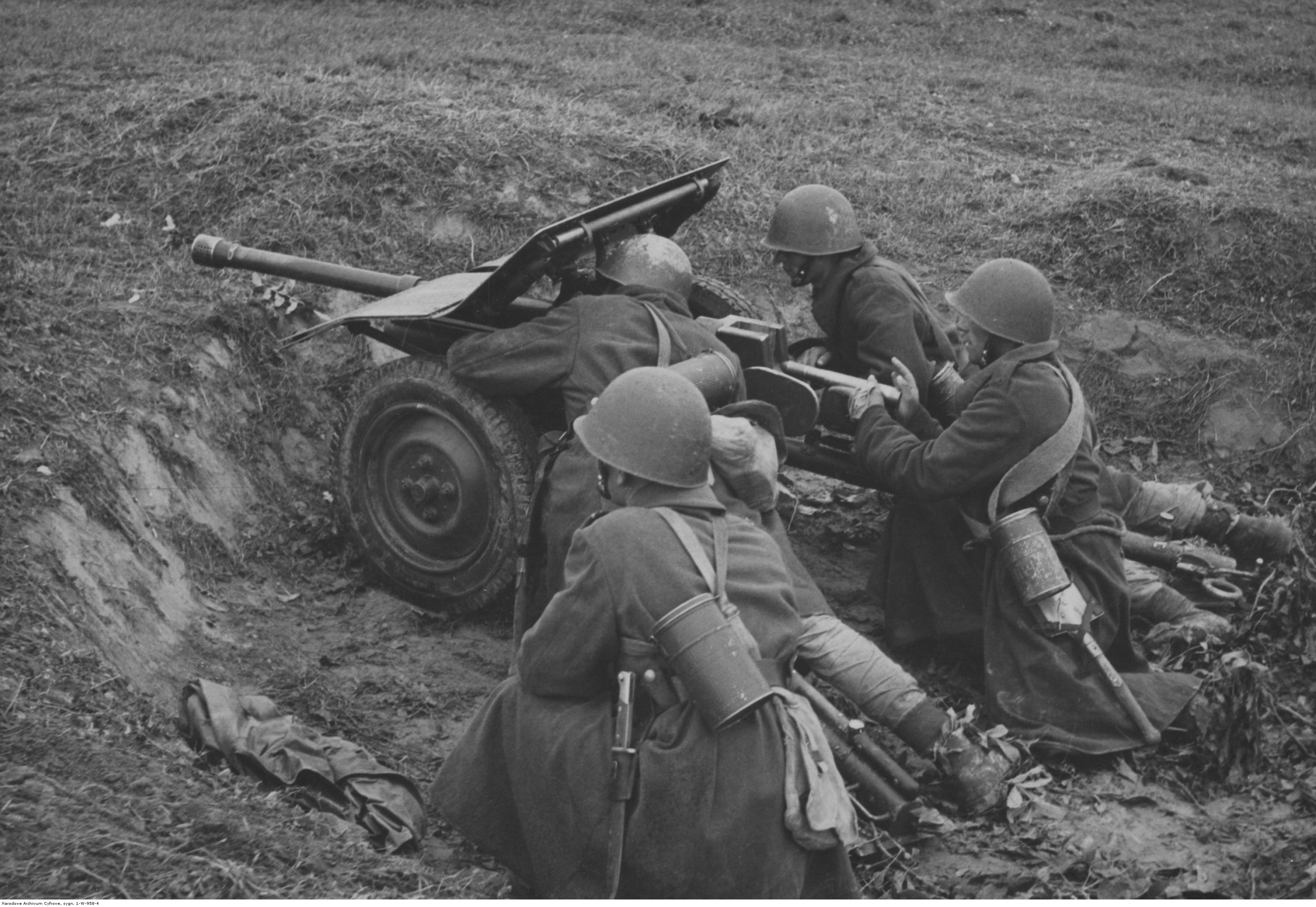
A four man crew on the Polish wz. 36 Bofors in 1938.

Poland
As 37 mm armata przeciwpancerna wz. 36. 300 guns were bought in Sweden and hundreds more were produced by SMPzA (Stowarzyszenie Mechaników Polskich z Ameryki) in Pruszków, some of them exported. When World War II began, the Polish Army had 1,200 pieces. A tank variant, designated wz. 37, was mounted in 7TP (single-turret version), 9TP (prototypes) and 10TP tanks. 111 of them were produced before the war.
Romania
669 pieces (former Polish ones) were bought from Germany.
Spanish Republic
Some guns bought by the Republicans were used during the Spanish Civil War.
Sweden
Adopted in 1937 as 37 mm infanterikanon m/34 (infantry gun model 1934). Modernized version was adopted in 1938 as 37 mm pansarvärnskanon m/38 (anti-tank gun model 1938) and 37 mm pansarvärnskanon m/38 F. The latter was also produced in a tank gun variant – 37 mm Kanon m/38 stridsvagn; it was fitted to Landsverk Strv m/38, Strv m/39, Strv m/40 light tanks and to the Strv m/41, a Swedish version of the Czech TNH light tank.
Turkey
United Kingdom
A number of Swedish m/34 ordered by Anglo-Egyptian Sudan were adopted as "Ordnance QF 37 mm Mk I".
Soviet Union
Several dozen Polish guns fell into Soviet hands. Late in 1941 these pieces were issued to Red Army units to make up for the lack of anti-tank guns.
Yugoslavia

== Gallery ==
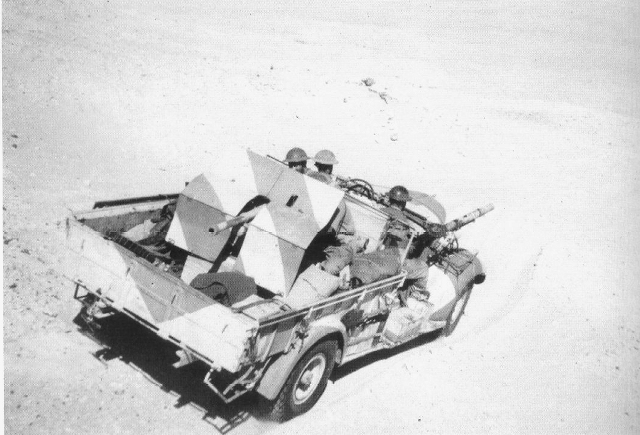
A Portée mounted Ordnance QF 37 mm Mk I on a 30 cwt Chevrolet WB

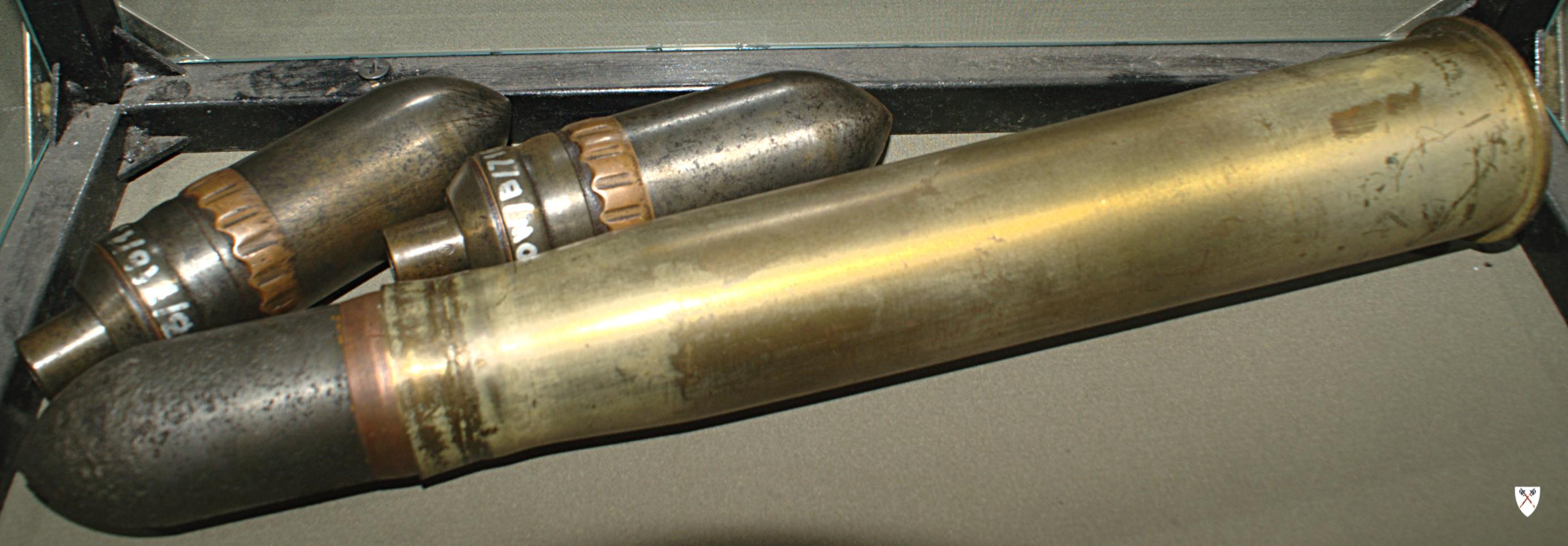
Bofors 37 mm ammunition

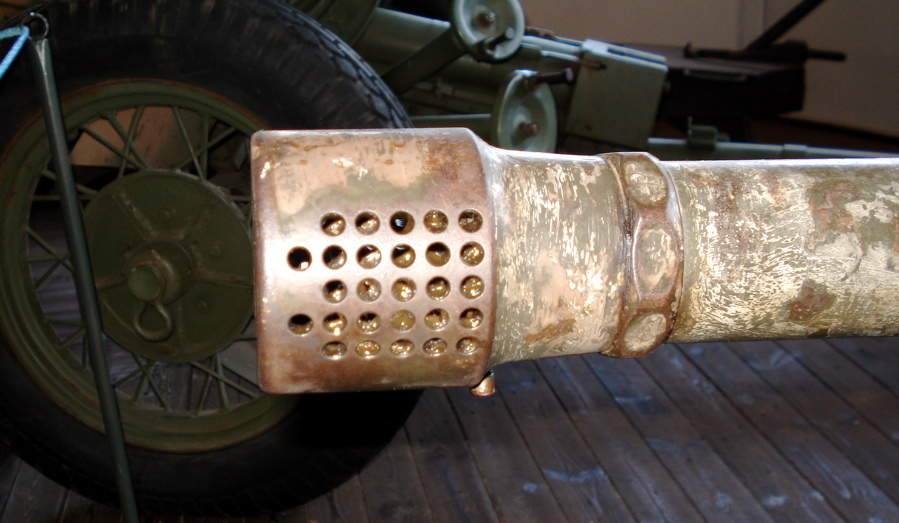
The pepper pot muzzle brake

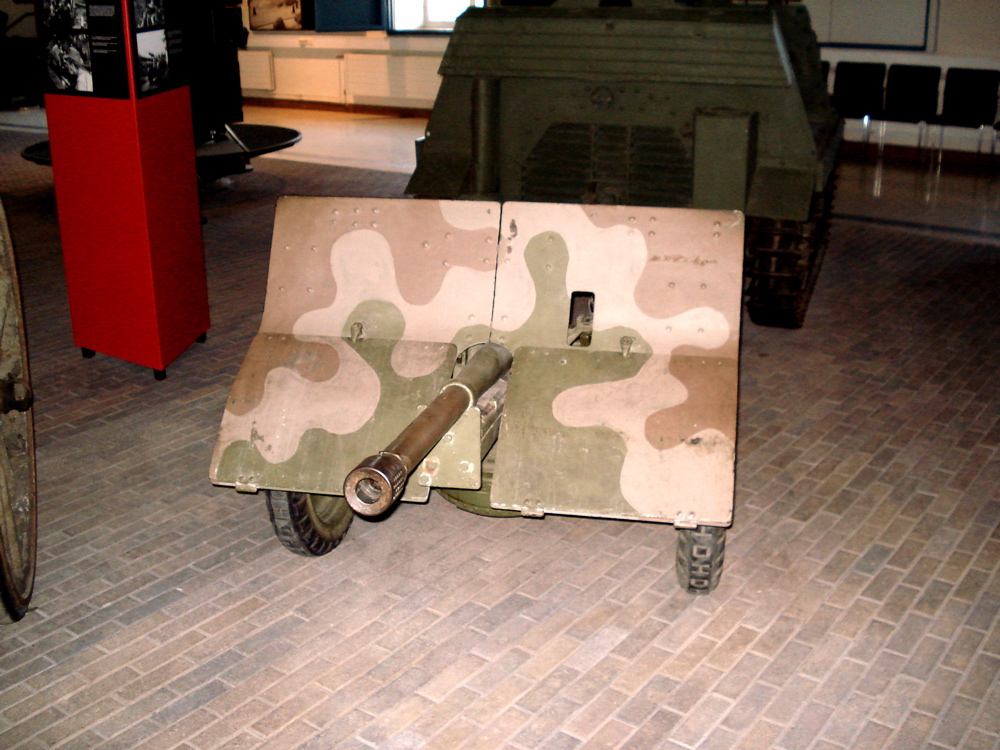
A Finnish-made gun at the Manege Military Museum, Suomenlinna fortress, Helsinki, 2006

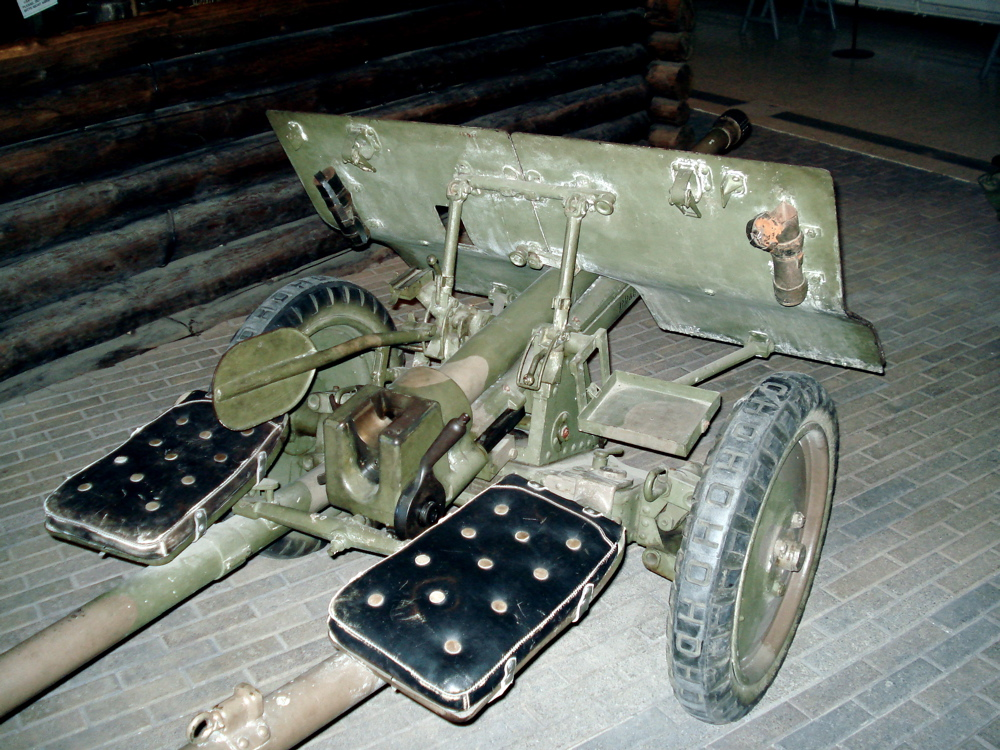
