= 14TP =

1930s Polish medium tank project

- Type: medium cruiser tank
- Place of origin: Poland

Service history
- In service: 1938-1939 (prototype)
- Used by: Polish Army

Specifications
- Mass: 14 t
- Length: 5.4 m
- Width: 2.55 m
- Height: 2.2 m
- Crew: 4
- Armor: 35-50 mm
- Main armament: 1x37 mm Bofors wz. 37
- Secondary armament: 2x7.92 mm Ckm wz.30
- Engine: 12 cylinder Maybach petrol 300 HP
- Power/weight: 21.4 hp/t
- Transmission: 5 gear mechanical gearbox
- Suspension: Christie
- Ground clearance: 40 cm
- Fuel capacity: 130 l
- Operational range: On-road range:210 km Off-road range:130 km
- Maximum speed: 50 km/h

The 14TP (Polish: czternastotonowy polski, English: 14-tonne Polish) was a Polish medium cruiser tank that was never completed due to the onset of World War II.

== Design ==
The project began in 1938. The new tank, which was built off the 10TP design was to significantly improve the performance and quality of the medium tanks. The thickness of the armor on either side would have no less than 35 mm. The tank could mount two types of guns: 37 mm Bofors Cannon, or a new 47-mm gun. To improve speed characteristics it was planned to put in a more powerful 12-cylinder engine (planned capacity from 300 to 400 HP). The design provided that the tank to be fully tracked.

The creation of the tank began with a search for an engine replacement for the American la France, which could not be installed on a new tank, as due to the large mass of the engine would move only under acceptable conditions on the roads. Engineers from BS PZ Inż. made new designs, but they remained only in drawings. As a consequence, it was decided to purchase the engines manufactured by Maybach, which meet the needs of engineers (300 HP).

By the end of 1938, about 60% of the work was completed, and in March 1939, the first tests were planned. However, it turned out that the company had sent 2 defective copies. Talks about the requirement to replace the damaged goods to more powerful semi-automatic engines stalled, leading to a halt of the project. Before the second world war, Poles had not agreed with the firm for the supply of engines. The project remained open, and in September 1939, the plans fell into the hands of the Germans.
