= Rudolf Gundlach =

Polish military engineer (1892–1957)

Rudolf Gundlach (1892–1957) was a Polish military engineer, inventor and tank designer. He headed the design division of the Armored Weapons Technical Research Bureau (Biuro Badań Technicznych Broni Pancernych). He held the military rank of major in the Corps of Engineers of the Polish Army.

He was the chief designer of the Ursus wz. 29 armored car and supervised design work for the 7TP light tank and the 10TP fast tank prototype.

== Early life ==
Rudolf Gundlach was born on 28 March 1892 in Wiskitki, Russian Empire (now Poland) into a Lutheran family. His father was a pastor. From 1903 to 1911, he attended a classical gymnasium in Łódź, and then entered the Riga Technical University where he studied until his conscription into the Russian Army in 1916. He graduated from a non-commissioned officers school of artillery and served in the 8th Heavy Artillery Brigade. In mid-1917, he became a member of the Union of Military Poles in Tartu. He organized an artillery unit for the Polish I Corps.

== Interwar Poland ==
Gundlach enlisted into the Polish Army in November 1918. After graduating from the Automotive Officers School in Kraków in October 1919, he served as an adjutant in the Automotive Command Center in Łódź. He was appointed lieutenant in December 1919 and commanded a column of military vehicles during the Polish–Soviet War. In 1925, Gundlach finished his studies at the Faculty of Mechanical Engineering of the Warsaw University of Technology, but failed to obtain the engineer's degree (he didn't take the diploma exam). In January 1930, he was promoted to the rank of captain, and in 1937 to the rank of major.

In interwar Poland, he worked in the Engineering Department of the Ministry of Military Affairs, as a clerk in the Institute of Engineering Research, and from 1931, was the head of the Armored Weapons Construction Bureau in the Army Research Institute for Engineering. In December 1934, he became the head of the Design and Construction Department in the Armoured Weapons Technical Research Bureau. He remained at this position until the outbreak of World War II. He was decorated with the Silver Cross of Merit.

== France ==
After the fall of Poland in 1939, Gundlach was one of hundreds of thousand Polish soldiers, technicians, scientists and engineers who escaped to France via Romania. In France he worked in the Bureau of War Industry (Biuro Wojennego Przemysłu przy Ministerstwie Przemysłu), and in the Ministry of Industry of the Polish Government in Exile. After the fall of France, health problems prevented him from evacuating to Great Britain and he stayed in Vichy France for the remainder of the war.

After the end of World War II, Gundlach sought enforcement of intellectual property rights over his periscope, which had been copied in several countries and produced under different names. He was unsuccessful in the United States due to long and costly court proceedings, but managed to obtain a license fee from the British Royal Commission.

He received a large payment for his periscope patent from some of its producers. In 1947, he gained compensation from the British authorities, and a French court awarded him 84 million francs for the use of his invention by Barbier-Bernard. After paying the attorney's fees, court costs, and taxes, he was left with 17 million francs, which allowed him to buy a villa in Le Vésinet near Paris. He established a bakery in 1953. His house served as a meeting place for Polish immigrants. He sold it in 1956 and moved to Colombes, where he died on 4 July 1957 and was buried at the local cemetery.

== Gundlach Rotary Periscope ==
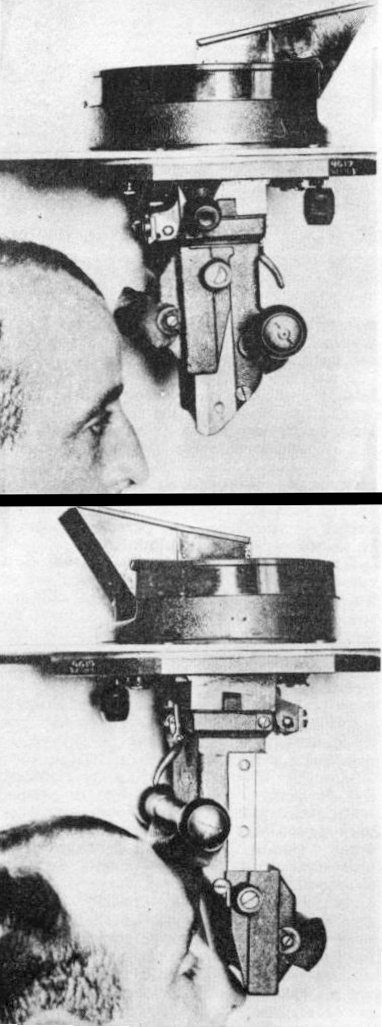
Gundlach periscope.

He is famous for his invention of the Gundlach Rotary Periscope (Polish: Peryskop obrotowy Gundlacha), patented in 1938, which made possible 360° vision. The periscope enabled an observer (e.g., the tank commander) to look forward (upper panel of the picture) or backward (lower panel) without moving his seat. Since it greatly increased the comfort of observer and widened the field of view, the new periscope design was used in virtually every tank built after 1940.

It was first implemented in TKS and 7TP Polish tanks. As a part of Polish-British pre-war military cooperation, the patent was sold to Vickers-Armstrong for one Polish Zloty. It was produced as Vickers Tank Periscope MK.IV (pictured), and built into all British tanks (such as Crusader, Churchill, Valentine, Cromwell). After the fall of Poland, Germany, the USSR and Romania captured equipment, allowing them to copy the invention. In the USSR, the Gundlach periscope was known as MK-4 and implemented in all tanks (including the T-34 and T-70). All Axis tanks and APC (including tanks of Italy, Romania, Hungary, Finland and Japan) were equipped or retro-fitted with this periscope until 1941. The technology was later transferred to the USA and implemented as the M6 periscope in all US tanks (M3/M5 Stuart, M4 Sherman and others). After the Second World War the technology was adopted thorough the whole world. Even today, original Gundlach periscopes are used in some tanks and APCs.

== Bibliography ==
- Grzegorz Łukomski and Rafał E. Stolarski, Nie tylko Enigma... Mjr Rudolf Gundlach (1892-1957) i jego wynalazek (Not Only Enigma... Major Rudolf Gundlach (1892-1957) and His Invention), Warsaw-London, 1999.

== See also ==
- Polish contribution to WWII
- List of Poles
