= Vickers 6-ton =

British light tank of the 1930s and WW2

Vickers 6-ton tank
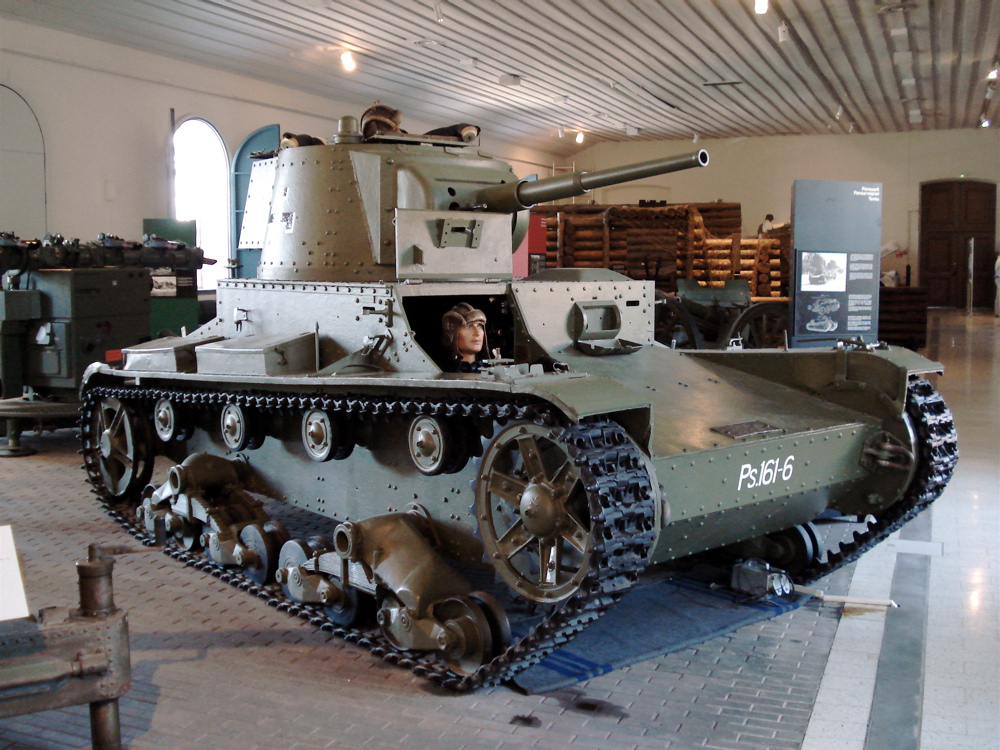
- A Finnish Vickers 6-ton rearmed with the Russian 20K gun at the Manege Military Museum, Helsinki, Finland (2006)
- Type: Light tank
- Place of origin: United Kingdom

Service history
- In service: 1932–1939 (Poland); 1938–1959 (Finland)
- Used by: Poland; Finland; Thailand; Republic of China; Soviet Union; And others
- Wars: Chaco War; Spanish Civil War; Second Sino-Japanese War; World War II; Winter War; Franco-Thai War

Production history
- Designer: John Valentine Carden; Vivian Loyd
- Designed: 1928
- Manufacturer: Vickers

Specifications
- Mass: 7.3 tonnes (7.2 long tons; 8.0 short tons)
- Length: 4.88 m (16 ft 0 in)
- Width: 2.41 m (7 ft 11 in)
- Height: 2.16 m (7 ft 1 in)
- Crew: 3
- Armour: 19 to 25 mm (0.75 to 0.98 in)
- Main armament: Type A 2 machine guns Type B 3-pdr (47 mm) gun (with 50 rounds)
- Secondary armament: Type B 1 Vickers machine gun
- Engine: Armstrong Siddeley petrol 80–98 hp (60–73 kW)
- Power/weight: 11–13 hp/t (8.2–9.7 kW/t)
- Suspension: leaf spring bogie
- Operational range: 160 km (99 mi)
- Maximum speed: 22 mph (35 km/h)

The Vickers 6-ton tank or Vickers Mark E, also known as the "Six-tonner", was a British light tank designed in 1928 in a private project at Vickers. Though not adopted by the British Army, it was picked up by several other armed forces, and licensed by the Soviet Union as the T-26. It was also the direct predecessor of the Polish 7TP tank.

== History ==
The first Mark E was built in 1928 by a design team that included the famed tank designers John Valentine Carden and Vivian Loyd. The hull was made of riveted steel plates, 1 inch (25.4 mm) thick at the front and over most of the turrets, and about 3/4 inch (19 mm) thick on the rear of the hull. The power was provided by an Armstrong Siddeley engine of 80–95 horsepower (60–71 kW) (depending on the version), which gave it a top speed of 22 mph (35 km/h) on roads.

Its suspension used two axles, each of which carried a two-wheel bogie to which a second set of bogies was connected with a leaf spring. It was patented by Carden in 1929 and apparently derived from a similar but simpler suspension on Light Tank Mk I which he patented a year earlier. Upward movement of either set of bogies would force the other down through the spring. This was considered to be a fairly good system for the time and offered better than normal cross-country performance although it could not compare with the contemporary Christie suspension. High strength steel tracks gave over 3,000 miles (4,800 km) of life which was considerably better than most designs of the era.

The tank was built in two versions:

- Type A with two turrets, each mounting a Vickers machine gun.
- Type B with a single two-man turret mounting a single machine gun and a short-barreled 47 mm OQF 3-pdr gun.

The Type B proved to be a real innovation: it was found that the two-man turret dramatically increased the rate of fire of either weapon, while still allowing both to be fired at the same time. This design, which they referred to as a duplex mounting, became common on almost all tanks designed after the Mark E.

The British Army evaluated the Mark E, but rejected it, because it did not envision a tactical niche for such a vehicle, preferring a combination of medium tanks and tankettes. Vickers then started advertising the design to all buyers, and soon received a trickle of orders eventually including the USSR, Greece, Poland, Bolivia, Siam, Finland, Portugal, China and Bulgaria. Thailand purchased 36 Vickers Medium Dragon Mark IVs, and QF 2-pounder naval guns were added to turn them into self-propelled guns used in the 1940-41 Franco-Thai War. Vickers built a total of 153 (the most common figure) Mark Es.

Experience with the Polish machines showed that the engine tended to overheat due to poor airflow over the air-cooled engine. This was addressed by the addition of large air vents on either side of the hull. For a new Belgian order the design was modified to use the Rolls-Royce Phantom II water-cooled engine instead. This engine would not fit in the rear, and had to be mounted along the left side of the tank, requiring the turret to be moved to the right and rearward. One example of the resulting Mark F was tested by Belgium, but rejected. Nevertheless, the new hull was used, with the older engine, in the sales to Finland and Siam.

The Mark E was also developed as a cargo vehicle, and purchased by the British Army in small numbers as artillery tractors to haul their large BL 60-pounder (127 mm; 5 in) field guns. Twelve were ordered by the Army as the Dragon, Medium Mark IV, while China purchased 23 and India 18.

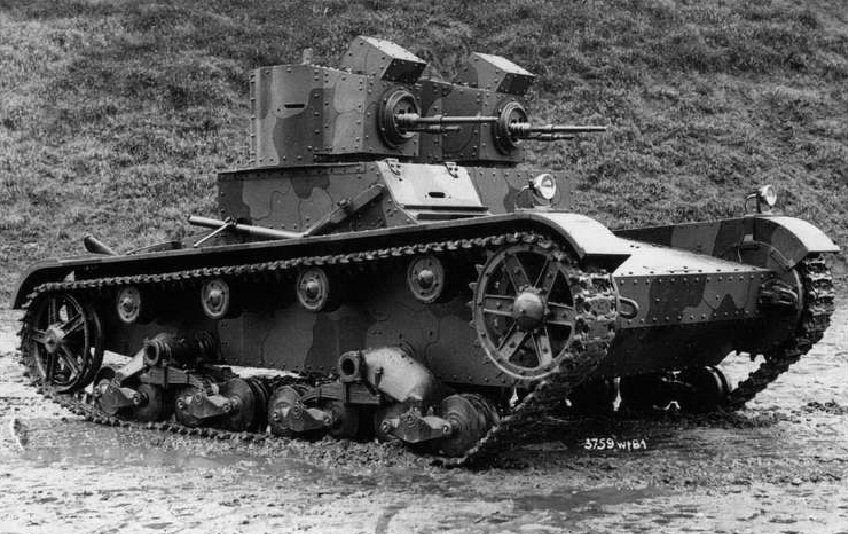
Polish Vickers E Type A (original version, twin turret)

Poland purchased 38 Type A tanks, spare parts and license for the local production. The Poles modified their vehicles with larger air intakes, their own machine guns, 360-degree Gundlach periscopes, and five or more with added two-way radios, before deciding to make their own tank that would address the shortcomings of the original Vickers design. This resulted in the 7TP, which was nearly 10 tons in weight.

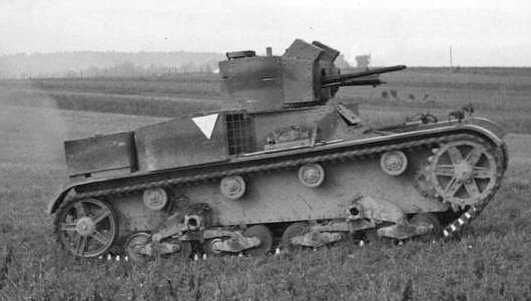
Polish Vickers E Type A (version with larger air intakes, twin turret)

The Poles also, besides the aforementioned telescope, added a liquid-cooled diesel engine as well as better armour protection, better ventilation, two-way radios, a 37 mm (1.46 in) Polish version of the Bofors anti-tank gun, and a bigger crew compartment. Out of 38 original two-turreted tanks, 22 were later converted to single turret version with a modified turret and the 47 mm (1.85 in) main gun (Type B standard). The tanks were in bad shape by 1939 because they were used in the training units over a period of five years. However, they did perform well and better than the Renault R35, amongst others, as part of the Polish 10. Cavalry Brigade during the Polish Campaign in 1939.

The Soviets were also happy with the design and licensed it for production. However, in their case local production started as the T-26, and eventually over 12,000 were built in various versions. The Soviet early twin-turret T-26s had 7.62 mm (0.3 in) DT machine guns in each turret, or a mix of one machine gun turret and one 37 mm gun turret. Later, more common versions mounted a 45 mm (1.77 in) gun and two DT machine guns. The final versions of the T-26 had welded construction and, eventually, sloped armour on the hull and turret. Because the T-26 was in such wide use and was a reliable platform, a variety of engineer vehicles were built on the chassis, including flamethrowers and bridgelayers. A novel radio-controlled demolition tank was built on the T-26 chassis also.

During the Spanish Civil War the Soviet Union sent the T-26 to the Republican Army. The Italians, after suffering losses from Republican T-26s during the battle of Guadalajara (1937), captured some of these tanks which served as models for their M11/39 and M13/40 medium tanks.

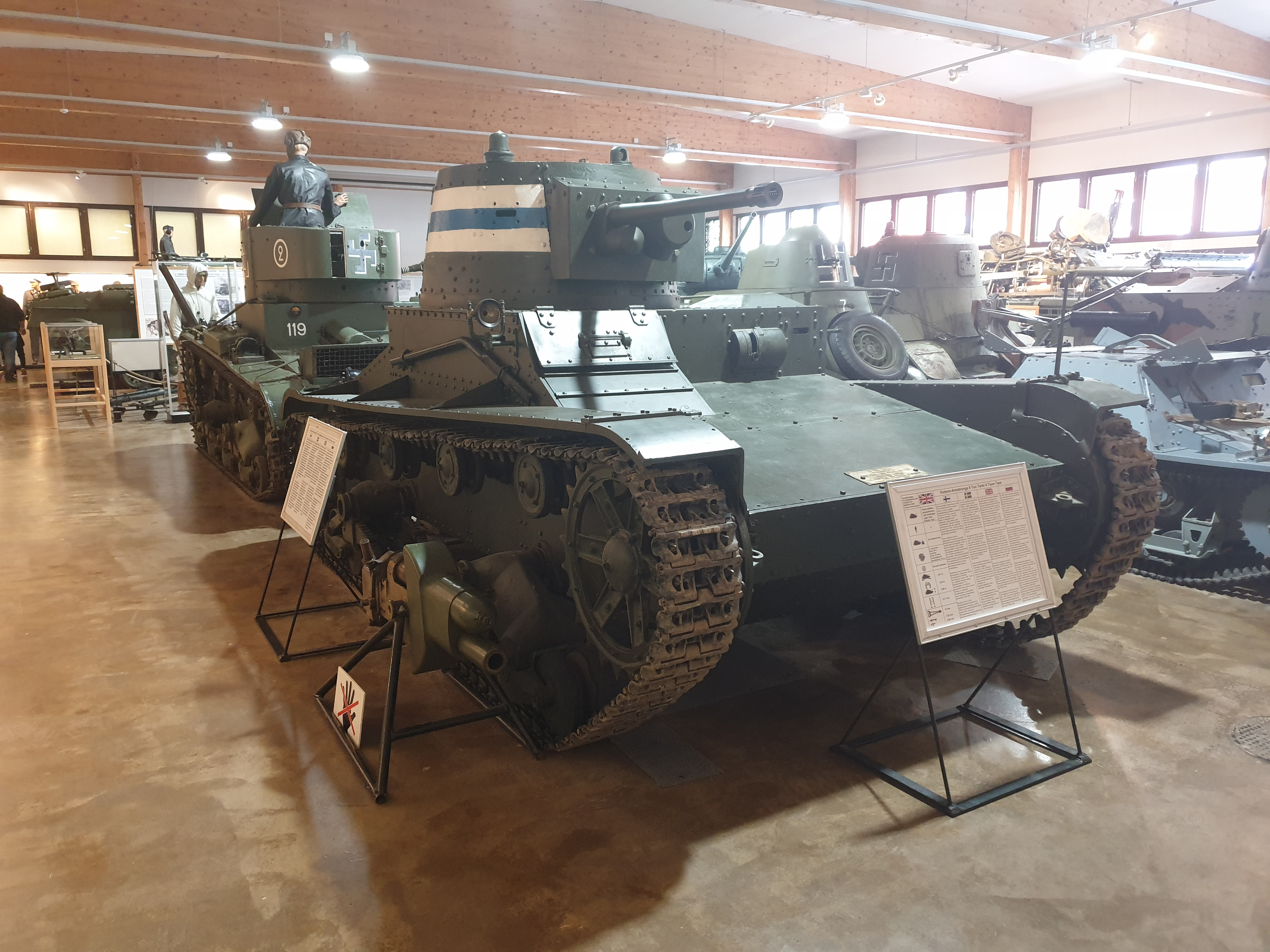
Vickers 6-ton tank in Parola Tank Museum, Finland. Armed with a Swedish 37 mm Bofors anti-tank gun.

In 1939, during the Soviet-Finnish Winter War, the Finnish armoured forces consisted of around thirty-two obsolete Renault FT tanks, some Vickers-Carden-Lloyd Mk. IVs and Model 33s, which were equipped with machine guns, and 26 Vickers Armstrongs 6-ton tanks. The latter had been re-equipped with 37 mm Bofors AT-guns after the outbreak of the war. Only 13 of these tanks managed to get to the front in time to participate in the battles.

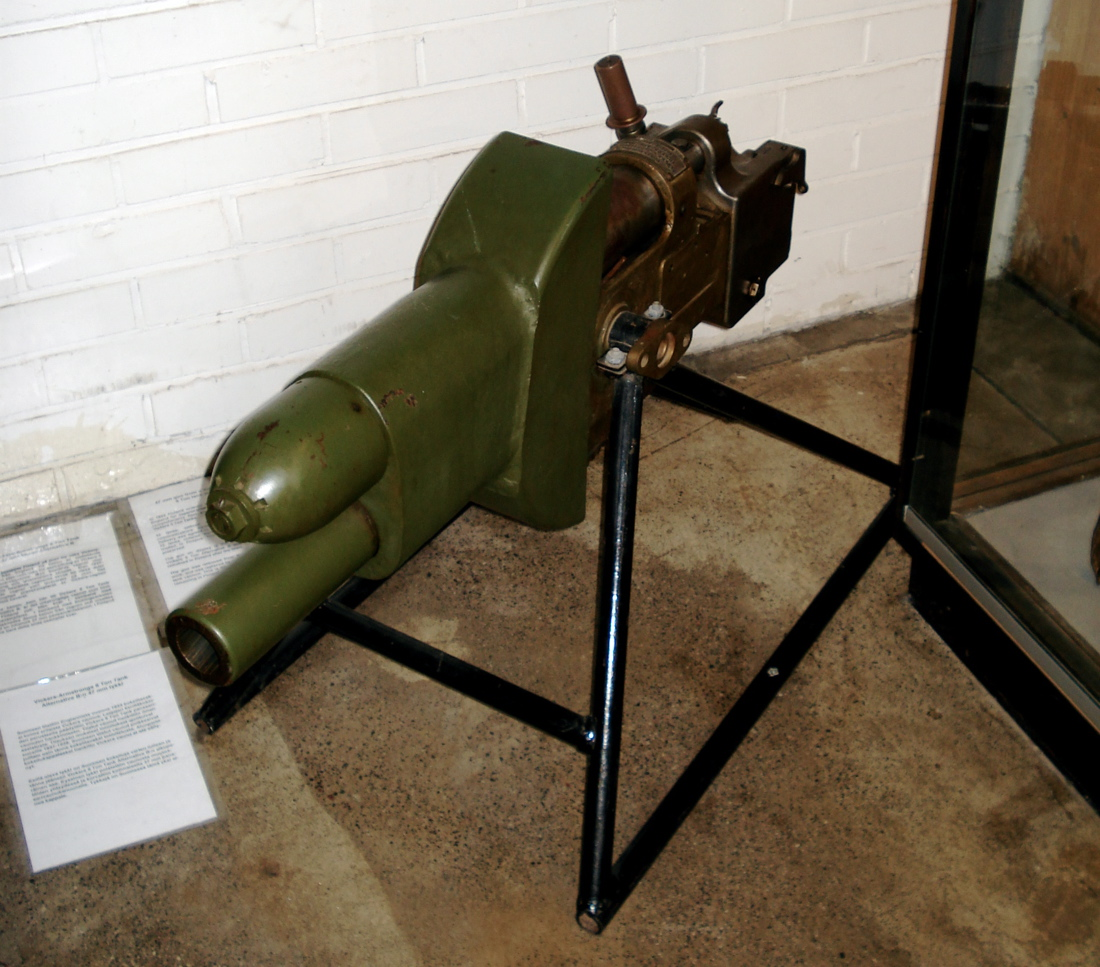
The original 47 mm gun for the Finnish evaluation model

At the Battle of Honkaniemi on 26 February 1940, the Finns employed their Vickers tanks for the first – and only – time against Soviet armour during the Winter War. The results were disastrous. Of the thirteen available Finnish Vickers 6-ton tanks only six were in fighting condition and able to participate in the first assault on the Soviet lines – to make matters worse, one of the tanks was forced to stop, unable to cross a wide trench. The remaining five continued onwards a few hundred metres but ran into dozens of Soviet tanks in the village of Honkaniemi. The Finnish tanks managed to knock out three Soviet tanks but were soon themselves knocked-out. In the skirmishes that followed, the Finns lost two more Vickers tanks.

In 1941, the Finns rearmed their Vickers 6-ton tanks with Soviet 45 mm guns and re-designated them T-26Es. These tanks were used by the Finnish Army during the Continuation War. Nineteen rebuilt Vickers tanks, along with 75 T-26s continued in Finnish service after the end of the Second World War. Some of these tanks were kept as training tanks until 1959, when they were finally phased out and replaced by newer British and Soviet tanks.

== Operators ==
- Bolivia – used one twin-turret tank Type A and two single-turret tanks Type B. The Bolivian Vickers tanks were the first to see combat service, also the first tanks to see combat in the Americas—in 1933 they were used in the Chaco War against Paraguay. All of them were destroyed or captured by Paraguayan forces. See Tank warfare in the Chaco War.
- Kingdom of Bulgaria – bought eight single-turret Mk.E Type B tanks, used by the 3rd Armoured Company.

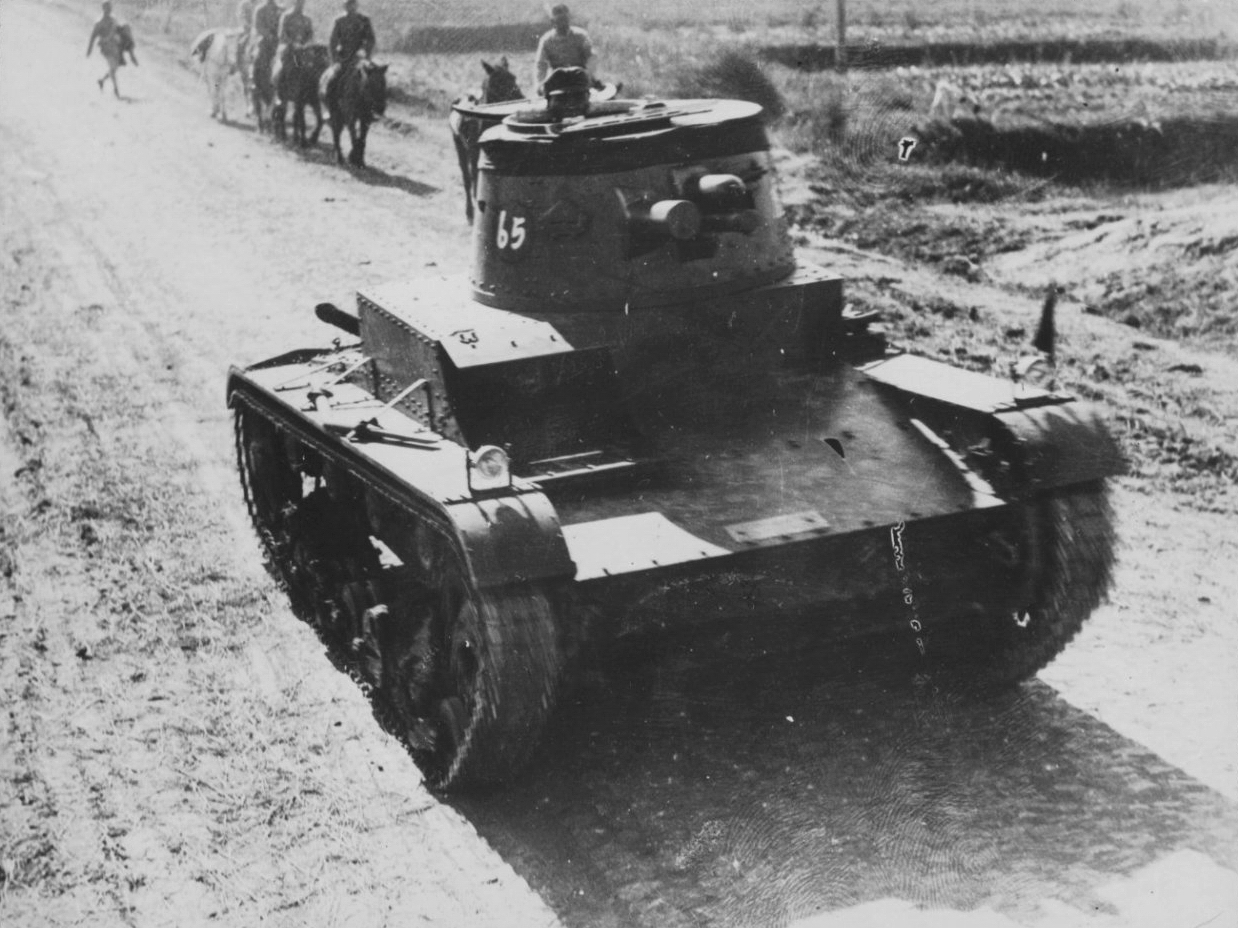
Vickers Mark E Type B in Chinese service

- (Republic of China (1912–1949)) Republic of China – used 20 single-turret tanks Vickers Mk.E Type B. They were used in combat against the Japanese in Shanghai in 1937.
- Finland – used 33 tanks since 1938 (including an evaluation tank). They were bought unarmed, without optics and radios. Some were armed with short-barreled 37 mm Puteaux guns and later equipped with 37 mm Bofors anti-tank guns as their main gun with a coaxial turret MG and a "tank SMG" in bow plate. They were used in the Winter War with the USSR. After this war, the Finns rearmed Mark E tanks with captured Soviet long 45 mm guns and DT MGs as used in the T-26. The Finns designated the rebuilt Vickers tanks logically as: T-26Es. They were used in combat from 1941 to 1944 and remained in service as training tanks until 1959.
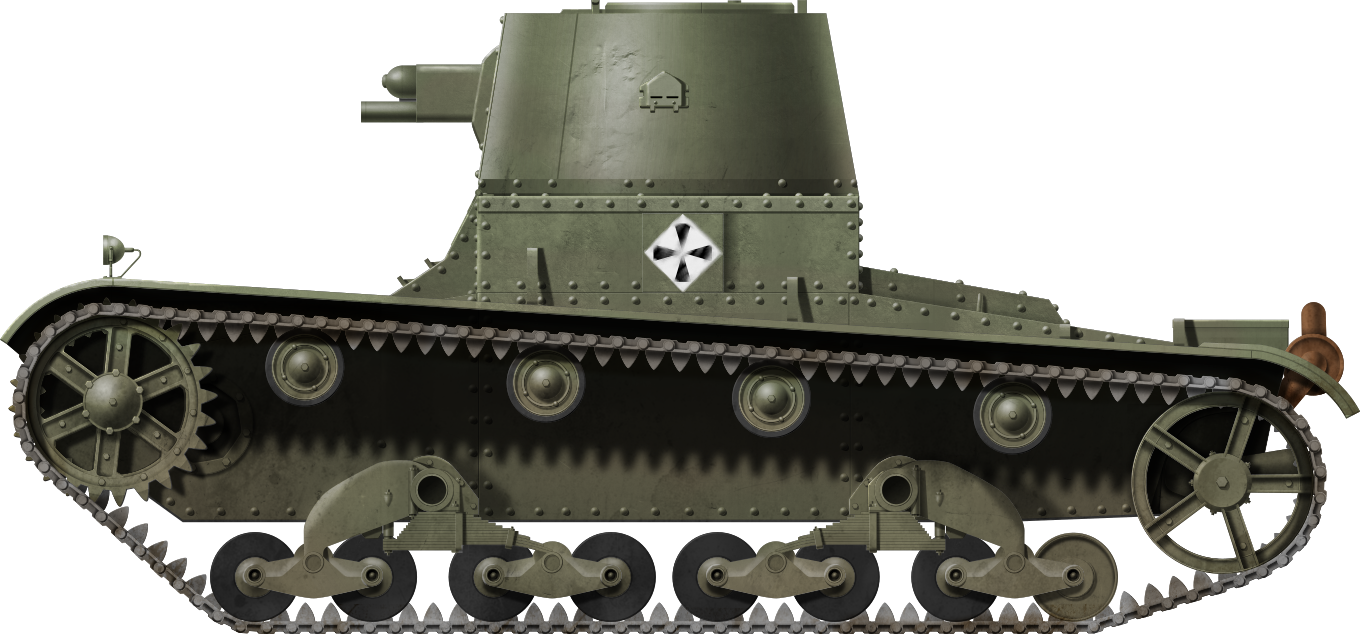
- Side Profile of Greek Vickers Mk E Type B
  Kingdom of Greece – one Type A and one Type B for tests, acquired in 1931. Along with two Carden-Loyd tankettes formed the first armoured battalion of the Hellenic Army, used for training and later in 1937 added to Greek Mechanized Cavalry Regiment, used against the Italian invasion in 1940. Ιn 15 January 1941 was transferred to 19th Mechanized Division during the German invasion. Greece ordered a large quantity of Vickers Mark E Type A and B from Britain after the successful test, but they were never delivered due to the priority given by Britain and France to their own rearmament and the outbreak of World War II.
- Kingdom of Italy – the Italians, after suffering losses from Republican T-26s during the Battle of Guadalajara, captured some of these tanks which served as models for their M11/39 and M13/40 light and medium tanks.
- Empire of Japan – The Imperial Japanese Army imported one Type A tank to research in 1930. The Imperial Japanese Army evaluated the design and developed the Type 95 Ha-Go.
- Paraguay – One double-turret Vickers Mk.E Type A tank captured from Bolivia, later used as monument, returned to Bolivia in 1994.
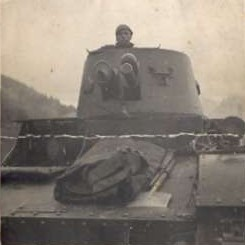
  Polish Vickers E Type B in 1938
- Second Polish Republic – used 38 tanks since 1932: 22 Type B and 16 Type A tanks. Polish tanks had large air intakes behind the crew compartments as a significant feature. Poland also bought a license and developed an own improved model 7TP. Vickers Mk.E (Vickers E) tanks fought in the Polish Campaign.
- Portugal – two tanks for tests
- Soviet Union – the first buyer of Vickers Mk.E tanks. In 1931 bought 15 twin-turret tanks Mk.E Type A, and a license. The Soviets next started building and developing own improved tanks T-26 (about 12 000 made).
- Spanish Republic – one ex-Bolivian single-turret Vickers Mk.E Type B tank bought from Paraguay, and a number of Soviet-made T-26s.
- Thailand (formerly Siam) – used 30 Vickers Mk.E Type Bs, which saw combat during the French-Thai War in French Indochina.

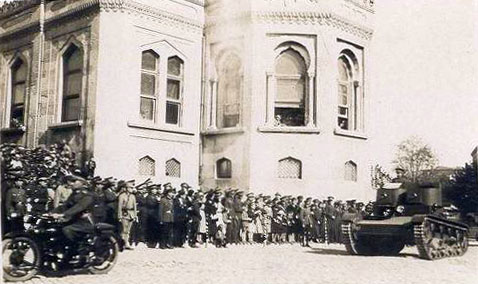
Vickers 6-ton tank Type A in Ankara, Turkey

- Turkey – used 16 Type A tanks since 1940.
- United Kingdom – used four tanks for training
- Kingdom of Romania – at least 19 captured from the Red Army
- United States - One example was sent to the United States for evaluation in June 1931. While reports were favorable and it was recommended that a few tanks should be purchased for further trials and evaluation, funding wasn't available. The trial tank was sent back to the United Kingdom and its fate is unknown.

== See also ==
- List of tanks

=== Comparable vehicles ===
- Germany: Panzer I • Panzer 35(t)
- Italy: L3/33 • L3/35
- Japan: Type 94
- Poland: TK-3 • TKS • 7TP
- Romania: R-1 • R-2
- Soviet Union: T-26 • T-27 • T-37A • T-38
- Sweden: Strv m/37
