= Vickers Tank Periscope MK.IV =

Tank periscope

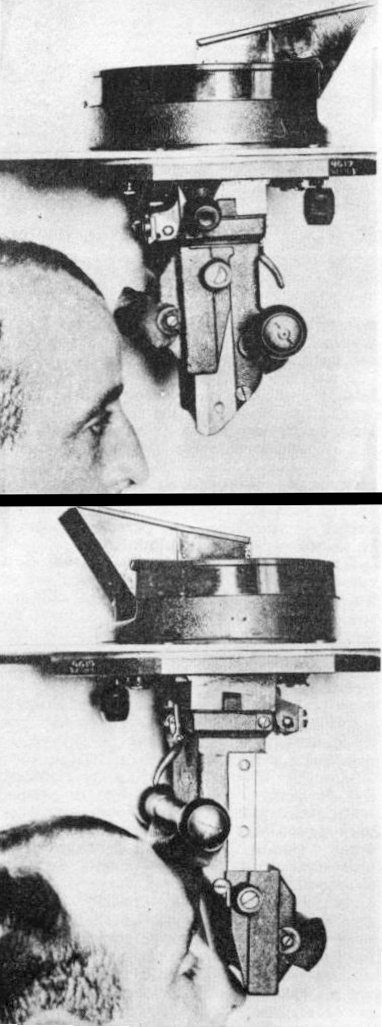
Gundlach periscope.

The Gundlach Periscope, usually known under its British designation as Vickers Tank Periscope MK.IV, was a revolutionary invention by Polish engineer Rudolf Gundlach, manufactured for Polish 7TP tanks from the end of 1935 and patented in 1936 as the Peryskop obrotowy Gundlacha. It was the first device to allow the tank commander to have a 360-degree view from his turret with a single periscope. By rotating the periscope and allowing the tank commander to look backwards through the second eyepiece, he no longer had to change position to look behind the turret. Early tanks had small turrets and fixed seating, without an independently rotating cupola, and so the commander wasn't easily able to move himself to another rear-facing periscope.

On 14 June 1935, it was officially adopted by the Polish Army, as reversible periscope G wz. 34. The design was first used in the TKS tankette, then in 7TP light tank. Shortly before the war it was given to the British and was used in almost all tanks of WWII, including the British Crusader, Churchill, Valentine and Cromwell and the American M4 Sherman. After the German and Soviet attack and fall of Poland in 1939 it was copied entirely from captured 7TP and TKS Polish tanks and later used by the Soviets for their tanks (including the T-34 and T-70).

As a part of Polish-British pre-war military cooperation, the patent was sold for one zloty to Vickers-Armstrong. It was produced as the Vickers Tank Periscope MK.IV (pictured), and built into all British tanks (Crusader, Churchill, Valentine, Cromwell). After the fall of Poland, Germany, USSR and Romania captured some equipment, allowing them to copy the invention. In USSR the Gundlach periscope was known as MK-4 (harking to the British designation, as Russian sources openly confirm that it was copied from samples acquired with British-supplied tanks) and implemented in all tanks (including the T-34 and T-70). At the end of World War II this technology was adopted throughout the world and used basically unchanged for almost 50 years, until it was replaced by electronic devices.
