= 7TP =

WW2 Polish light tank

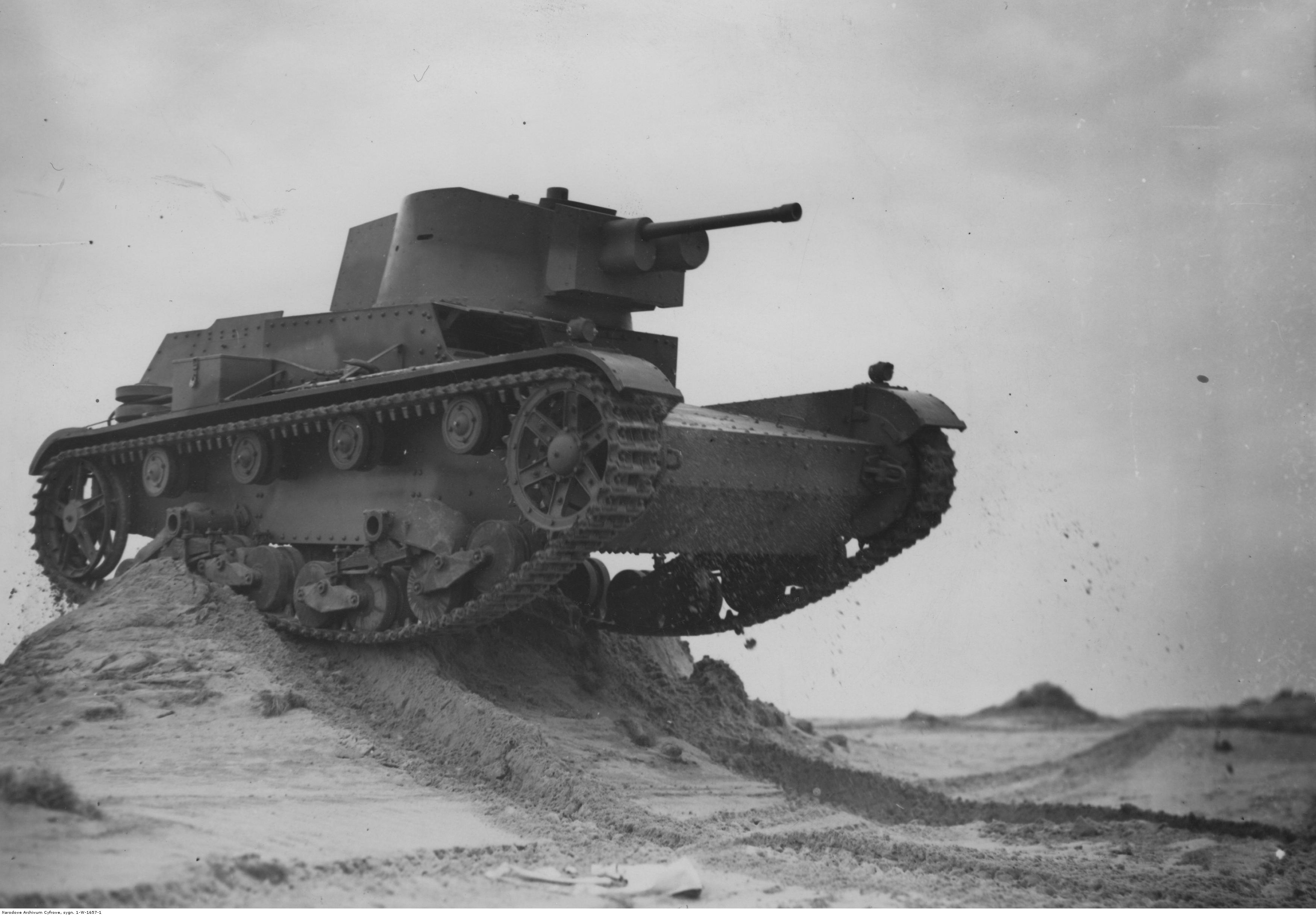
- Single-turret 7TP
- Type: Light tank
- Place of origin: Second Polish Republic

Service history
- Used by: Second Polish Republic; Nazi Germany (captured)
- Wars: World War II

Production history
- Produced: 1935-1939
- No. built: 149 (+13 9TP prototypes)
- Variants: twin-turret 7TP single-turret 7TP; 9TP (prototypes only)

Specifications
- Mass: 9.9 tonnes
- Length: 4.6 m (15 ft 1 in)
- Width: 2.4 m (7 ft 10 in)
- Height: 2.27 m (7 ft 5 in)
- Crew: 3 (commander, gunner, driver)
- Armor: 17 mm maximum
- Main armament: 37 mm Bofors wz. 37 gun
- Secondary armament: 1× 7.92 mm Ckm wz.30 machine gun
- Engine: PZInż.235(Saurer VBLDd) Liquid-cooled inline 6-cylinder 4-stroke direct injection diesel engine 110 hp (80 kW)
- Power/weight: 11 hp/tonne
- Suspension: leaf spring bogie
- Ground clearance: 0.38 m
- Operational range: 150 km (93 miles)
- Maximum speed: 37 km/h (23 mph)

The 7TP (siedmiotonowy polski, lit. 'Polish 7-tonne') was a Polish light tank of the Second World War. It was developed from the British Vickers 6-ton. A standard tank of the Polish Army during the 1939 Polish Campaign, its production did not exceed 150 vehicles. Its chassis was used as the base for the C7P artillery tractor.

== Design ==
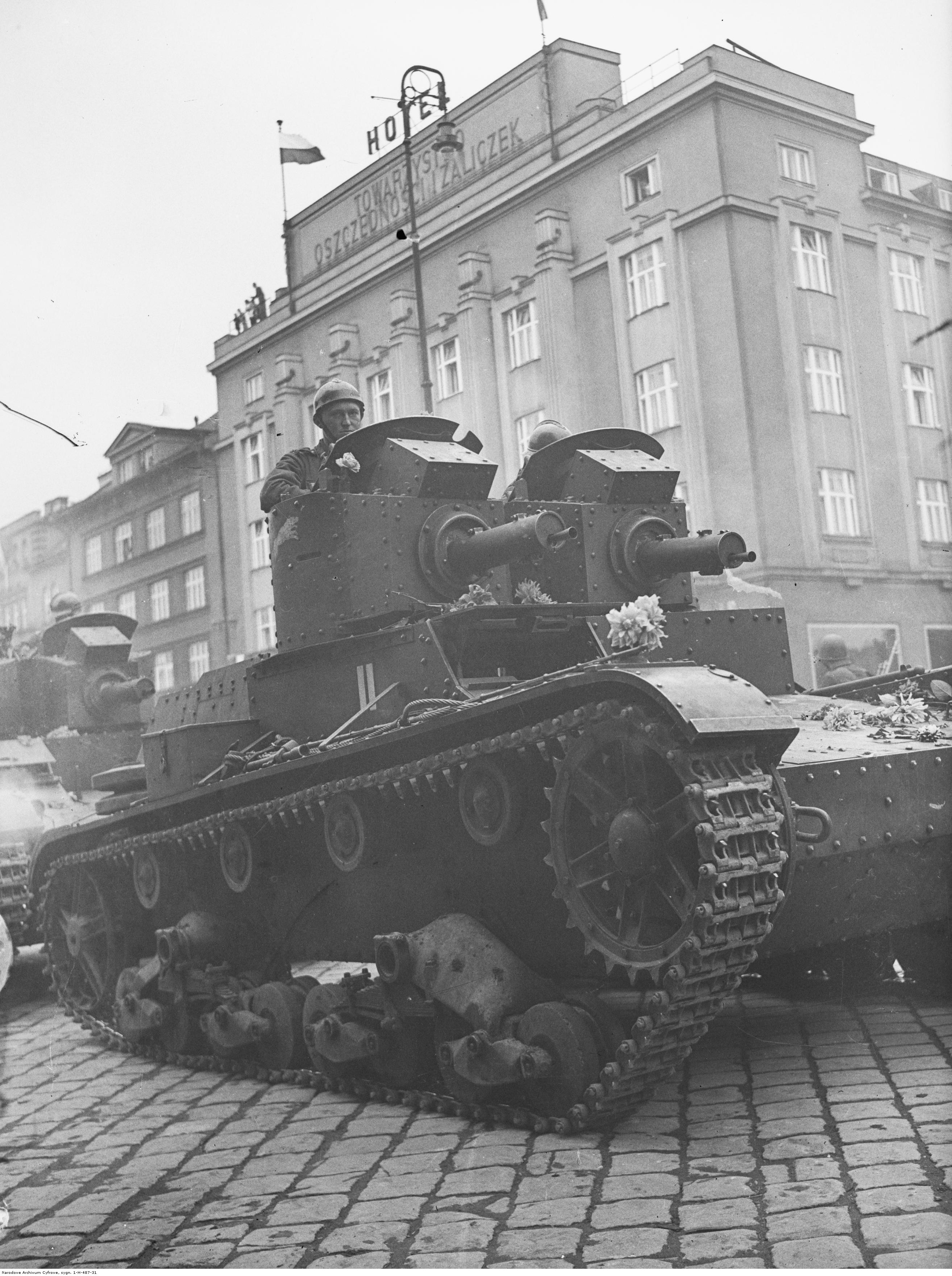
A twin-turreted version of the 7TP, pictured reclaiming Trans-Olza in October 1938 following the Munich Agreement

The 7TP was the Polish development of the British Vickers 6-ton Mark E tank licence. Comparing to Vickers, the main new features of 7TP were: a better, more reliable and powerful diesel engine, a 37 mm anti-tank gun, thicker armour (17 mm instead of 13 mm on the front), modified ventilation, the Gundlach tank periscope, and a radio. About 132 tanks were produced between 1935 and the outbreak of the war, plus four iron prototypes. The designation 7TP meant "7 Tonne, Polish" (in fact its weight increased to 9 tonnes after the initial prototype).

Although the 7TP is often claimed to be the world's first (production) diesel-powered tank, this distinction actually goes to Japanese Type 89B I-Go Otsu, produced with a diesel engine from 1934 onwards. Barring that, the claim of a first purpose-designed diesel-powered tank is tied with Type 95 Ha-Go, whose series production also commenced in 1935.

Like its British predecessor, the 7TP was initially produced in two variants: twin turret version armed with 2 Ckm wz.30 machine guns, and a single turret version, armed with 37 mm Bofors wz. 37 gun. After initial tests, it became clear that the twin-turret variant was obsolete and lacked firepower, so it was abandoned in favour of the more modern single turret design.

Prior to the outbreak of World War II most of the twin turret tanks were converted to single turret versions and only 24 twin-turret types remained in Polish service (as opposed to roughly 108 of the other type). Twin and single turret variants had no specific designations. In some modern books they are unofficially designated "7TP dw." and "7TP jw." (Polish abbreviations for dwuwieżowy – dual turreted; jednowieżowy – single turreted).

In 1938 Państwowe Zakłady Inżynierii also produced 13 prototype models of a better armored version of the 7TP – the 9TP. Although the 9TP never entered production, these prototypes were used in the defense of Warsaw in September 1939.

=== Foreign interest ===
Romania sent a military commission in late autumn 1935 to evaluate the 7TP for a future acquisition. Although the tank fared well during field trials, the Romanian officers were not impressed by the armour of the Polish prototype and instead recommended the acquisition of the Czechoslovak LT vz. 35 tank.

== Combat history ==
All 7TP tanks took part in combat in the defence of Poland during the German Invasion of Poland in 1939. Most of them were attached to two light tank battalions (the 1st and the 2nd). The remaining tanks, that is the ones used for training as well as tanks that were finished after the outbreak of the war, were used in an improvised tank unit fighting in the defence of Warsaw. Although technically superior to any of the German light tanks of the era, the 7TP was too scarce to change the outcome of the war.

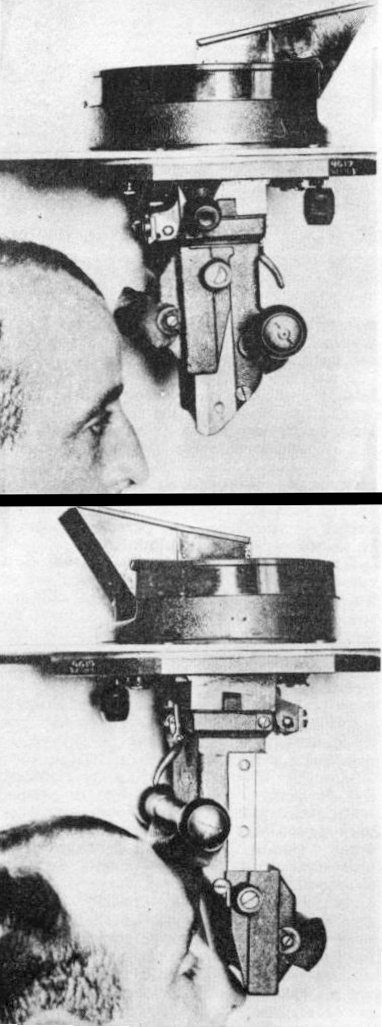
7TP was fitted with 360-degree Gundlach periscope.

The 1st Light Tank Battalion (49 single turret tanks) fought in the ranks of the Prusy Army as part of the strategic reserve force of the Polish Army. It entered combat on September 4, 1939, and fought with distinction in a variety of roles, mostly as a mobile reserve and for covering the withdrawal. It fought in a number of battles, most notably in the battles of Przedbórz, Sulejów, Inowłódz, Odrzywół and Drzewica. On September 8 it managed to stop the German advance on the centre of the Polish forces, but the following day it got separated from the main force and had to be withdrawn to the rear. Part of the battalion was destroyed in the Battle of Głowaczów, while the remainder on September 13 managed to break through to the other side of the Vistula, where it joined the Lublin Army and Col. Stefan Rowecki's Warsaw Armoured Motorised Brigade. As part of that unit, the battalion took part in the Battle of Józefów and formed part of the spearhead of the Polish units trying to break through to Lwów and the Romanian Bridgehead. After the Battle of Tomaszów Lubelski, on September 21, 1939, the remaining tanks were destroyed by their crews and the unit surrendered to the Germans.

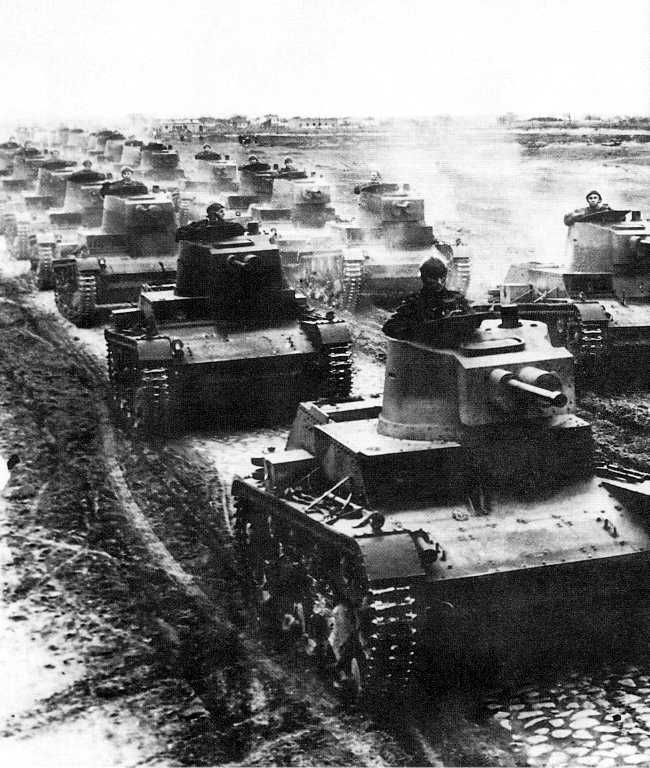
During maneuvers.

The 2nd Light Tank Battalion (49 single turret tanks) was attached to the Piotrków Operational Group of the Łódź Army. It entered combat on September 4 near the river of Prudka, Bełchatów. The following day it was ordered to lead the Polish counter-assault on Piotrków, but the attack failed because, in spite of retaking some ground from the Germans and destroying German tanks and armored vehicles, the objectives of the mission were not met (the Germans reinforced their positions with artillery). The unit lost 2 tanks and 6 more were taken away disabled. The unit was down to 24 fully operational tanks. The battalion was then rallied and withdrew to Warsaw and then to Brześć, where it shielded the mobilization of the Polish 60th Infantry Division. On September 15 it took part in a two-days long Battle of Włodawa, but suffered heavy losses due to air bombardment and was withdrawn southwards. The remaining 11 tanks had to be destroyed by the crews due to lack of oil and on September 17, after the Soviet Union joined Germany in her war against Poland, the crews and the staff of the unit crossed the border with Romania.

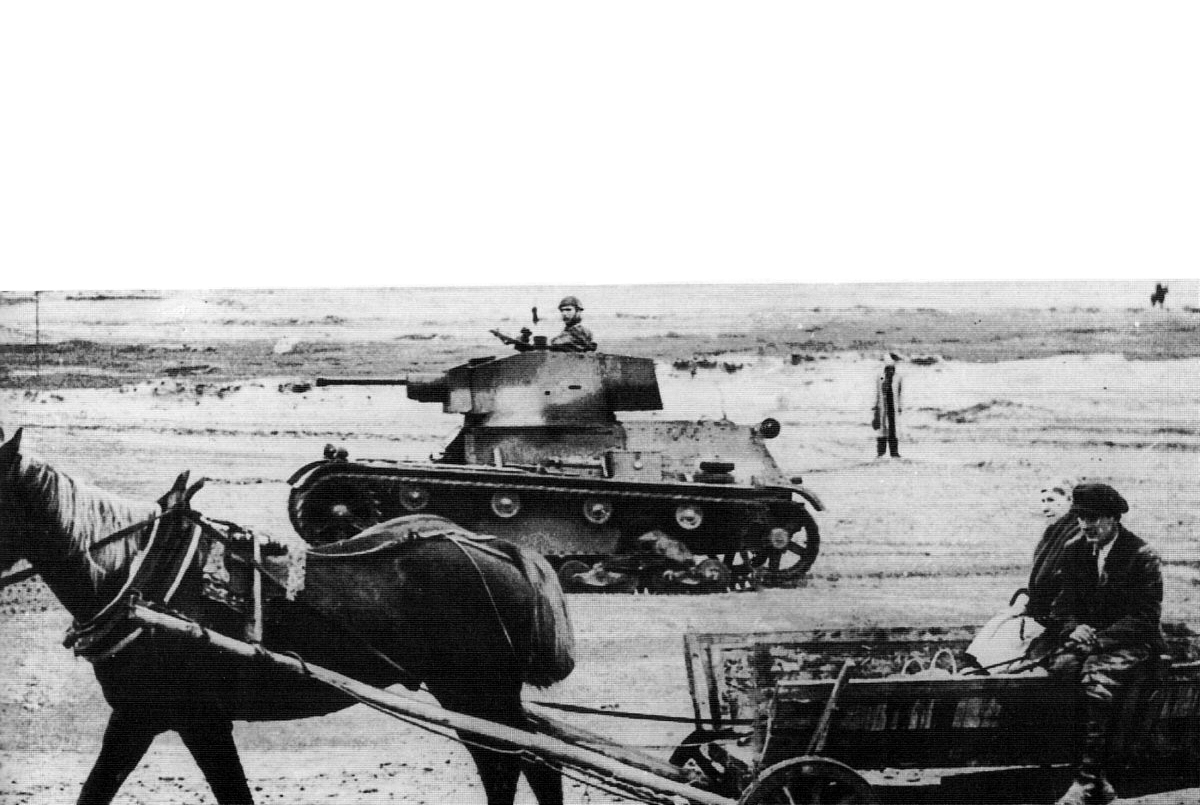
Tank 7TP during the 1939 invasion of Poland.

The remaining tanks found in Warsaw were formed into the 1st and 2nd Company of Light Tanks by the Command of the Defence of Warsaw. The 1st company had 11 twin-turreted tanks, previously used for training. In the opening stages of the Siege of Warsaw the unit took part in heavy fighting for Warsaw's suburb of Okęcie and the major airport located there. Due to lack of anti-tank armament, the tanks of the 1st company suffered losses and were withdrawn to the rear on September 12, where the unit was joined with the 2nd company.

The 2nd company had 11 single-turret tanks, as well as an unknown number of other armoured vehicles. It took part in successful defence of the borough of Wola against German infantry and armoured units. It was also used for tactical counterattacks, among others for the village of Wawrzyszew, where the company managed to disrupt enemy preparations for the assault. On September 15 the company was ordered to form a spearhead of the Polish attack aimed at linking up with the forces of the Poznań Army withdrawing after the Battle of Bzura through the Kampinos forest north of Warsaw. The attack ended up as a minor success, although the German aerial bombardment caused heavy losses both in personnel and in tanks. The remaining 7TP tanks were used on various sectors of the front until the end of the defence of Warsaw on September 27, when they were destroyed by their crews. At the same time, one 7TP was captured by the Soviets during their invasion of Poland.

The combat experience proved that the Bofors wz. 37 anti-tank gun used in the 7TP was able to penetrate the armour of any of the German tanks of the time, including the newest, the Panzer IV. On the other hand, the 7TP was too lightly armoured, especially against aerial bombardment.

== Reconstruction ==
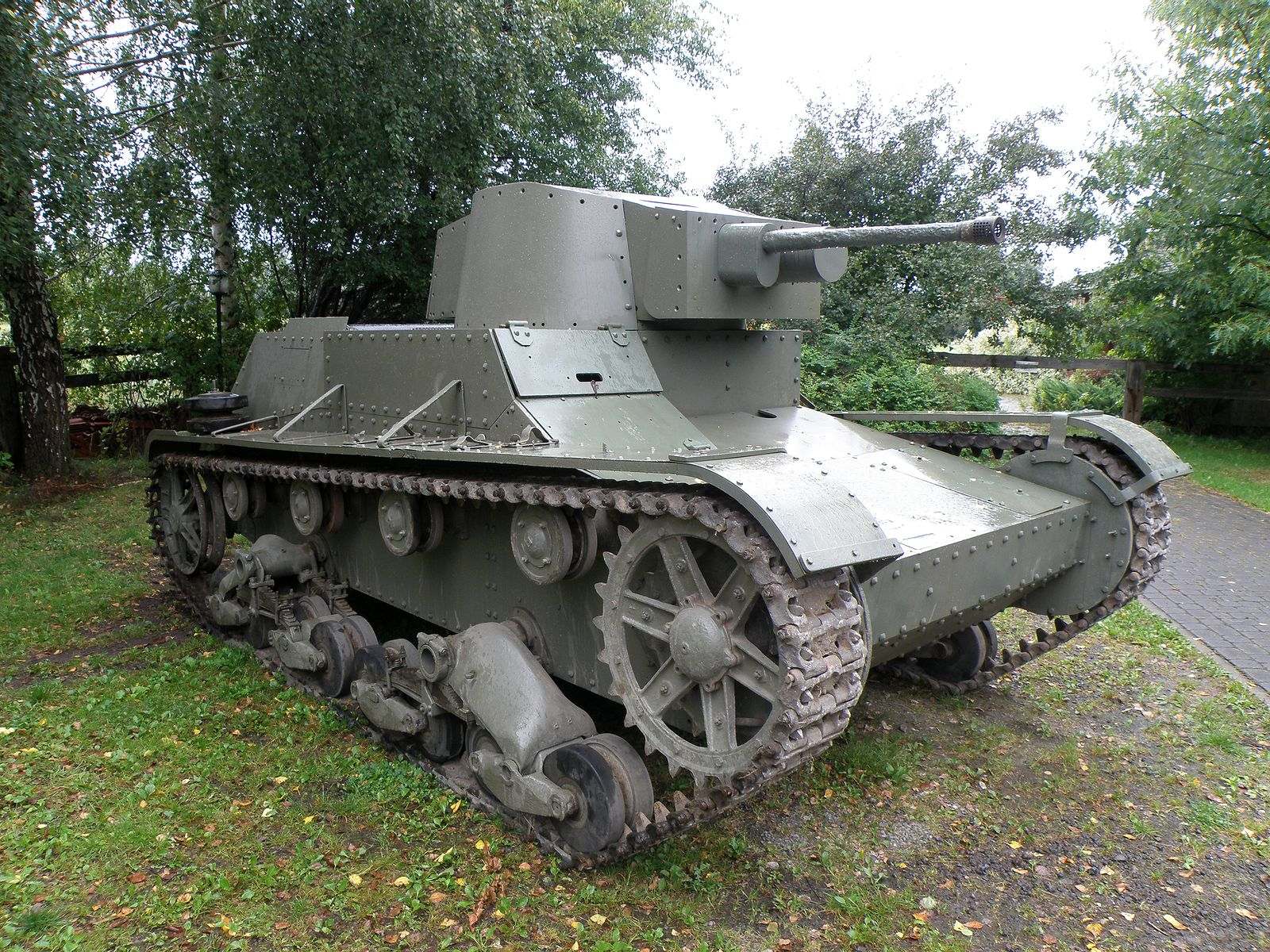
Reconstructed 7TP in Łomianki 2011

No complete 7TP tanks have survived to this day, although it is planned to build a copy of the tank for the Museum of the Polish Army in Warsaw.

A turret gun from a 7TP which was used against the invading Germans in September 1939 and later employed by the Germans in France, is on display in the Polish Institute and Sikorski Museum in London.

A 7TP is being reconstructed in Bielsko-Biała, its reconstruction will include many original parts recovered from various places in Poland. It now has an original gearbox and will be soon armed with an original 37mm Bofors gun. The tracks come from a T-26. The reconstructors presented progress of their work at various reenactors' meetings and historic anniversaries.

== Operators ==
- Poland - 133 7TP jw, 16 7TP dw, and 13 9TP.
- Nazi Germany - 20 7TP jw captured during German invasion of Poland.

Evaluation only

- Soviet Union - At least 4 7TP jw captured during Soviet invasion of Poland, used for testing.

== See also ==
- T-26, a similar Soviet tank, also based on the Vickers 6-Ton

== Bibliography ==
- (in English)The Encyclopedia of Tanks and Armored Fighting Vehicles - The Comprehensive Guide to Over 900 Armored Fighting Vehicles From 1915 to the Present Day, General Editor: Christopher F. Foss, 2002 ISBN 978-1-86227-188-3
- (in English)Tanks of the World, 1915–1945, Peter Chamberlain, Chris Ellis, 1972 ISBN 978-0-8117-1261-3
- (in Polish)J. Magnuski, "Czołg lekki 7TP" vol.I, Militaria, 1996; ISBN 978-83-7769-549-4
- (in Polish and English) Janusz Magnuski, "7TP vol.II", Militaria (317), Warsaw 2009. ISBN 978-83-7219-317-9
- (in Polish)L. Komuda, "Polski czołg lekki 7TP", TBiU nr 21, 1973; [ISBN unspecified]
- (in Polish)A. Jońca, R. Szubański, J. Tarczyński, "Pojazdy Wojska Polskiego 1939", WKŁ, 1990; ISBN 83-206-0847-3
- (in Polish)J. Magnuski, "Produkcja czołgów 7TP 1935-39 r.", nTW 12/1996; ISSN 1230-1655
- (in Polish)J. Magnuski, "Angielski lekki czołg Vickers Mark E w polskiej służbie", nTW 5/1999; ISSN 1230-1655
- (in Polish)R. Szubański, "Polska broń pancerna 1939", wydawnictwo MON, 1982; ISBN 978-83-11-06771-4
