= Admiral Petre Bărbuneanu-class corvette =

1983 class of Romanian Navy corvettes

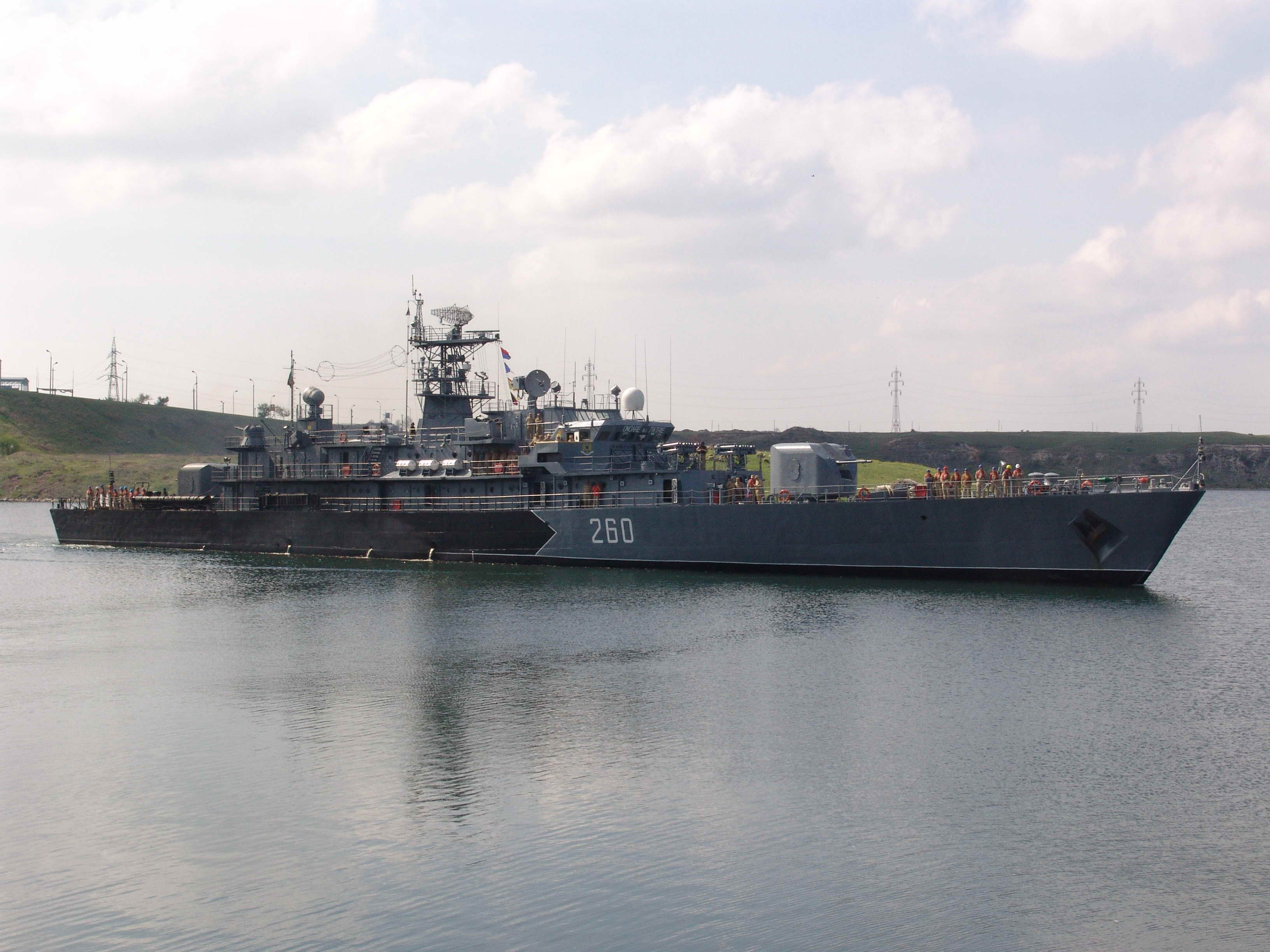
- The corvette Amiral Petre Bărbuneanu entering Mangalia military harbour.

Class overview
- Name: Admiral Petre Bărbuneanu class
- Operators: Romanian Naval Forces
- Succeeded by: Tetal-II class
- In commission: 1983–present
- Planned: 4
- Completed: 4
- Active: 2
- Retired: 2

General characteristics
- Type: Corvette
- Displacement: 1,440 t (1,420 long tons) full load
- Length: 92.4 m (303 ft 2 in)
- Beam: 11.7 m (38 ft 5 in)
- Draught: 3 m (9 ft 10 in)
- Propulsion: 4 shaft, 4 × diesel engines, 15,000 kW (20,000 bhp)
- Speed: 24 knots (44 km/h; 28 mph)
- Complement: 98
- Sensors & processing systems: Radar: Strut Curve, Drum Tilt; Sonar: Hull mounted
- Armament: 2 × twin AK-276 76 mm (3.0 in) guns; 2 × twin AK-230 30 mm (1.2 in) AA guns; 2 × single 14.5 mm (0.57 in) machine guns; 2 × twin 533 mm (21.0 in) torpedo tubes; 2 × RBU 2500 ASW rocket launchers
- Notes: Namesake Petre Bărbuneanu

The Admiral Petre Bărbuneanu-class corvette (also known as the Tetal-I class by NATO) is a series of four corvettes designed and constructed for the Romanian Naval Forces primarily for anti-submarine warfare. Only two corvettes out of a total of the four are still in service. Designed and constructed in the 1980s, they are a product of the Cold War with their armament and sensors based on Soviet designs. This class of corvettes was superseded by the Rear-Admiral Eustațiu Sebastian (Tetal-II) class.

== Design and description ==
The Admiral Petre Bărbuneanu class was based on the Soviet Navy's Koni-class frigate but designed in Romania to a smaller size, though retaining their anti-submarine warfare (ASW) role. They incorporated Soviet weapons and sensors into their design. Vessels of the class have a full load displacement of 1,440 tonnes (1,420 long tons) and measure 92.4 metres (303 ft 2 in) long with a beam of 11.7 m (38 ft 5 in) and a draught of 3 m (9 ft 10 in). The ships are powered by four diesel engines driving four shafts creating 15,000 kilowatts (20,000 bhp). (Note: Gardiner, Chumbley & Budzbon state the ships only had two shafts, and Saunders states the vessels were only capable of 9,700 kW (13,000 hp).) This gives the corvettes a maximum speed of 24 knots (44 km/h; 28 mph).

The vessels are armed with four Soviet-designed AK-276 76-millimetre (3.0 in)/59 calibre guns in two twin turrets with one turret situated forward and aft. The 76 mm guns have a range of 16 kilometres (9.9 mi) and fire up to 90 rounds per minute. For anti-aircraft (AA) defence, the corvettes have four AK-230 30 mm (1.2 in)/65 calibre AA guns in two twin mounts positioned aft, forward of the aft 76 mm turret. The 30 mm guns have a range of 4 km (2.5 mi) and can fire up to 500 rounds per minute. They also mount two single-mounted 14.5 mm (0.57 in) machine guns along the amidships. For ASW purposes, the Admiral Petre Bărbuneanu class mounts RBU 2500 16-tubed ASW rocket launchers that are trainable with a range of 2,500 m (8,200 ft). The ships have four 533 mm (21.0 in) torpedo tubes in two twin mounts situated aft to either side of the aft 76 mm gun turret. They can fire Type 53-65 torpedoes which have a range of 25 km (16 mi).

Admiral Petre Bărbuneanu-class corvettes are equipped with Soviet MR-302 (NATO reporting name: Strut Curve) air search/surface search radar, MR-104 Rys (NATO reporting name: Drum Tilt) and MR-105 Turel (NATO reporting name: Hawk Screech) fire control radar. They have Hercules MG-22 hull-mounted sonar for underwater search and two PK 16 chaff launchers and RW-23 (NATO reporting name: Watch Dog) electronic support measures. The corvettes have a complement of 98.

== Ships in class ==
Admiral Petre Bărbuneanu class
Hull number	Name	Builder	Launched	Commissioned	Status
F 260	Amiral Petre Bărbuneanu	Mangalia Shipyard, Romania	23 May 1981	4 February 1983	In service
F 261	Viceamiral Vasile Scodrea	Mangalia Shipyard, Romania	5 June 1982	3 January 1984	Decommissioned 2004
F 262	Viceamiral Vasile Urseanu	Mangalia Shipyard, Romania	9 September 1983	3 January 1985	Decommissioned 2004
F 263	Viceamiral Eugen Roșca	Mangalia Shipyard, Romania	11 July 1985	23 April 1987	In service

== Construction and career ==
The vessels were constructed at the Mangalia Shipyard for the Romanian Naval Forces. The first ship to commission was Amiral Petre Bărbuneanu in 1983. Three more corvettes would follow before the project was terminated in 1987 in favour of a new design that incorporated a helicopter flight deck. In 2004, two of the corvettes, Vice-Amiral Vasile Urseanu and Vice-Amiral Vasile Scodrea were decommissioned. The remaining ships are based at Constanța.
