= VERA passive sensor =

Radar detection system

VERA
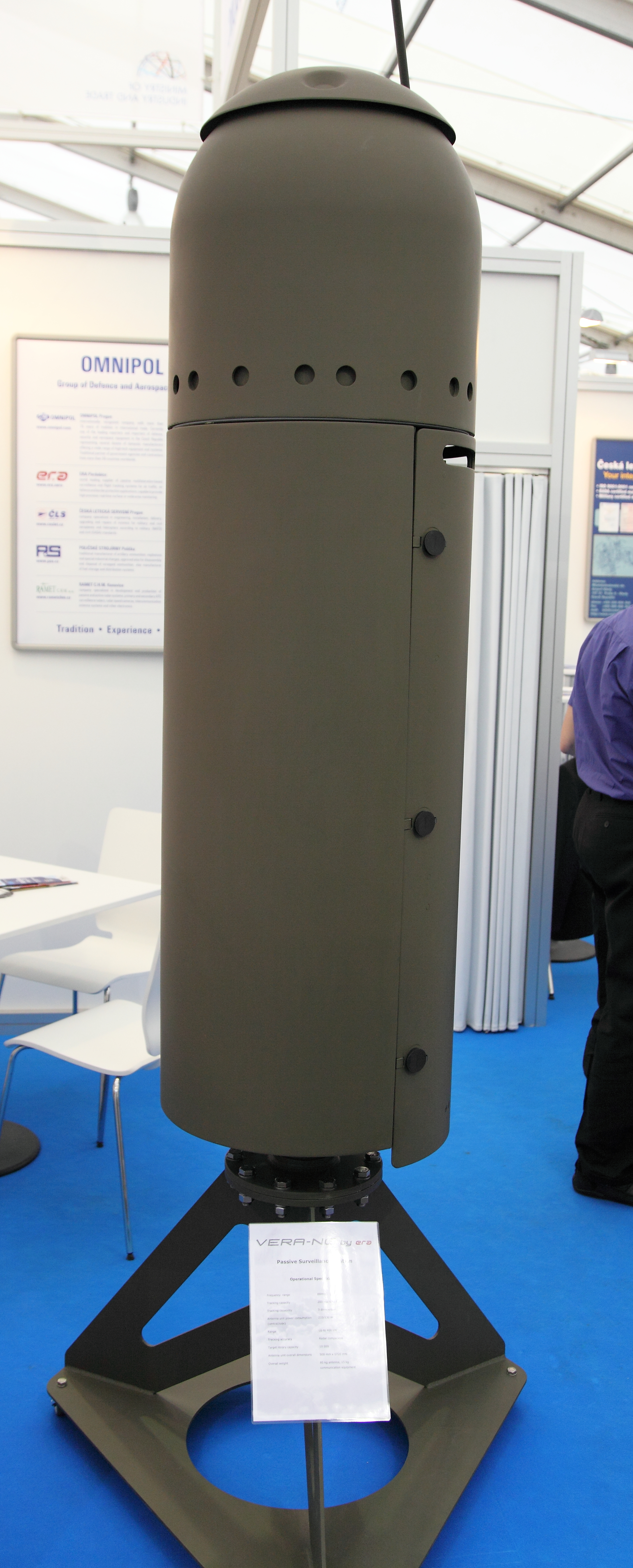
- VERA next generation receiver unit
- Country of origin: Czech Republic
- Type: Ground-based emitter tracking system
- Frequency: 1–18 GHz
- Range: ~450 km nominal
- Azimuth: 120–360° depending on mode
- Other names: (Vietnam) V-ELINT 18 (VEI18G/M) (resemblance)
- Related: PLESS

The VERA passive surveillance ESM system (known as Věra in Czech) is an electronic support measures (ESM) system that uses measurements of the time difference of arrival (TDOA) of pulses at three or four sites to accurately detect and track airborne emitters. The system is manufactured by ERA a.s., based in Pardubice.

== History ==
VERA is the latest in a long history of Czech ESM TDOA systems. The first system developed by the Czech army in 1963 was known as PRP-1 Kopáč which could track 6 targets.

This was followed by KRTP-81 Ramona (NATO reporting name Soft Ball) in 1979, which could track 20 targets, and KRTP-86 Tamara (NATO reporting name Trash Can) in 1987, which could simultaneously track 23 radar targets and 48 IFF targets.

These were widely exported to the former Soviet Union and beyond. These predecessors were manufactured by the state company Tesla, which collapsed after the Velvet Revolution (1989). Lead engineers from the former Tesla company formed the ERA Company in Pardubice which produces the current generation VERA family of sensors.

Timeline

- October 30, 2006 - Rannoch Corporation announced the acquisition of ERA a.s. located in Pardubice Czech Republic.
- February 6, 2007 – Rannoch Corporation has officially changed its name to Era Corporation.
- July 2008 - Era Corporation was acquired by SRA International.
- November 22, 2011 - ERA Pardubice was bought by Czech arms and aircraft trading company Omnipol.

== Mode of operation ==
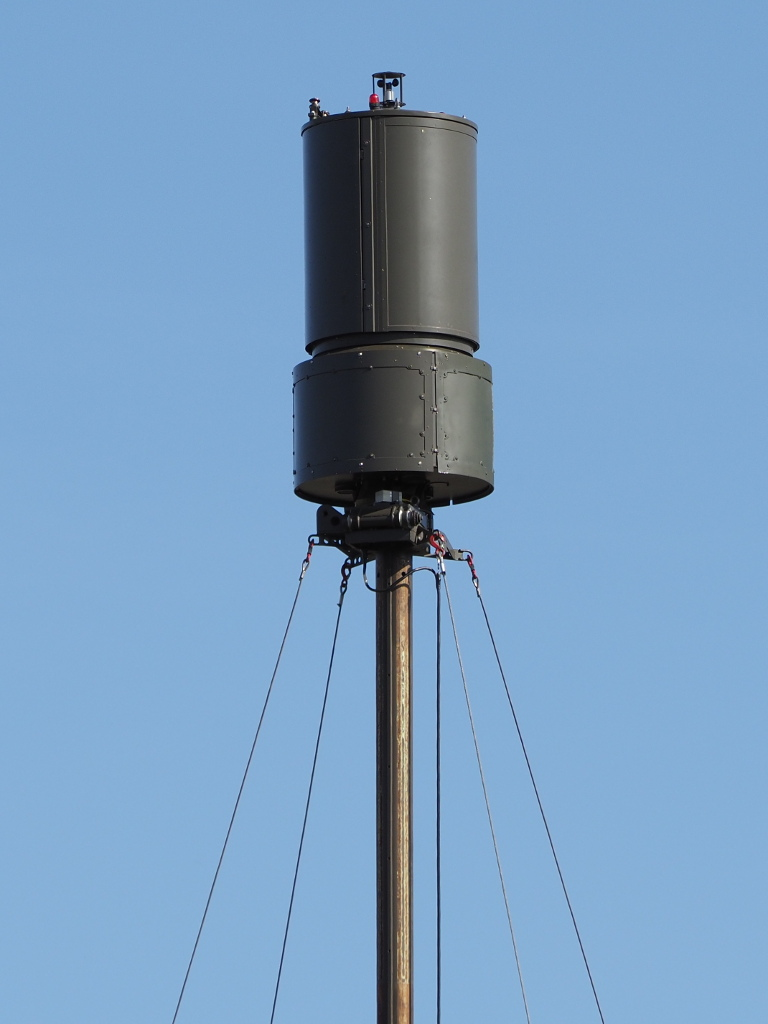
Receiver of VERA S/M

The deployed system typically comprises a central site (containing the signal processing equipment and an ESM receiver) and two or three side sites containing only an ESM receiver. The side sites relay the signals received to the central site over a point-to-point microwave link. The central site uses the known propagation delay from the side sites to estimate the TDOA of the pulses at each site.

The TDOA of a pulse between one side site and the central site locates the target on a hyperboloid. A second side site provides a second TDOA and hence a second hyperboloid. The intersection of these two hyperboloids places the target on a line, providing a 2D measurement of the target's location (no height).

A third side-site provides a third hyperboloid, which, when intersected with the line provided by the other two side sites, provides a full 3D location of the target. This process is known as multilateration.

The height of a target with an SSR Mode C or Mode S transponder can also be provided by decoding the Mode C or Mode S response directly, which is the normal mode of operation for the civilian VERA-AP system.

== System accuracy ==
System accuracy is typically better than a microwave surveillance radar, and is a function of the deployment geometry, the inherent timing accuracy of the central site, the bandwidth of the pulse being detected and the signal-to-noise ratio. Wider separations of the side sites from the central site provide better accuracies – but at the expense of a reduced area of common coverage. Typically side sites are deployed 15–40 km from the central site, providing a reasonable compromise of coverage and accuracy.

The system is generally line-of-sight limited, with a nominal range of 450 km, the normal radio horizon. Detection of targets is within a sector of approximately 120 degrees, although IFF and SSR targets are detected using a dedicated omnidirectional antenna, and hence may be seen over 360 degrees. Up to 200 targets can be automatically tracked simultaneously, with an output rate adjustable from 1 to 5 seconds.

== Exploited emitters ==
The current generation sensor can only detect and track pulsed emissions, due to the requirement to measure the time of arrival of pulses. The receivers operate in the frequency range of 1–18 GHz and typically exploit secondary surveillance radar (SSR) transponders, identify friend or foe (IFF) transponders, airborne radars, weather radars, tactical air navigation (TACAN) transponders, distance measurement equipment (DME) beacons, digital communications signals and pulsed jamming signals.

== Versions ==
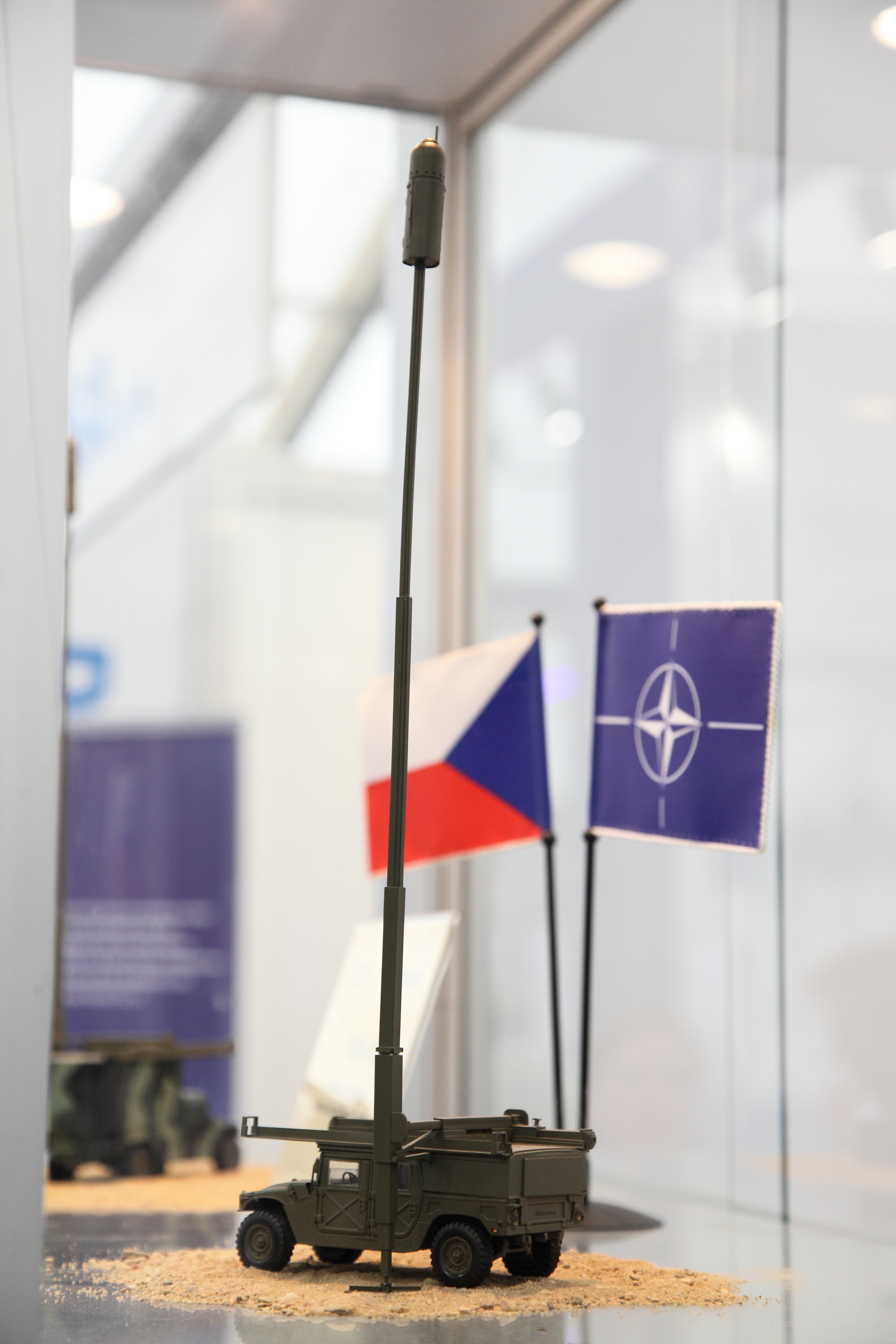
Model of VERA-NG

VERA is supplied in a number of versions. VERA-AP is the civilian long-range air traffic control (ATC) version, which only exploits civilian SSR transponders at 1030 and 1090 MHz.

VERA-E is the export version of the military ESM version of the system, also referred to as the VERA-S/M in its national mobile version. In addition, the shorter range VERA-P3D system is marketed for highly accurate monitoring of transponder-equipped ground vehicle movement at airports. The manufacturers also market an ESM triangulation system known as BORAP.

Czech company ERA in cooperation with the German SMAG introduced a brand new mobile antenna mast for its system VERA-NG in 2017.

In 2025, ERA introduced successor PLESS (Passive Long-range ESM Surveillance System) with detection range of 700km, including targets without active radio emmiters, including beyond-horizon targets. Three PLESS systems were immediately ordered by the Czech Army

== Exports ==
Public domain literature claim VERA-E systems have been exported to Malaysia, Estonia, Pakistan and the United States. Newspaper reports also claimed that in January 2004 the Czech defence sales company, Omnipol, received licence to sell six systems to China. However, US government pressure on the Czech government resulted in the cancellation of this contract. Civil systems have been widely exported throughout Europe.

Within the Czech Republic, a mobile VERA-E unit is operated by the 53rd Passive Radiotechnical Reconnaissance System and Electronic Warfare Centre at Planá near České Budějovice.

== Users ==
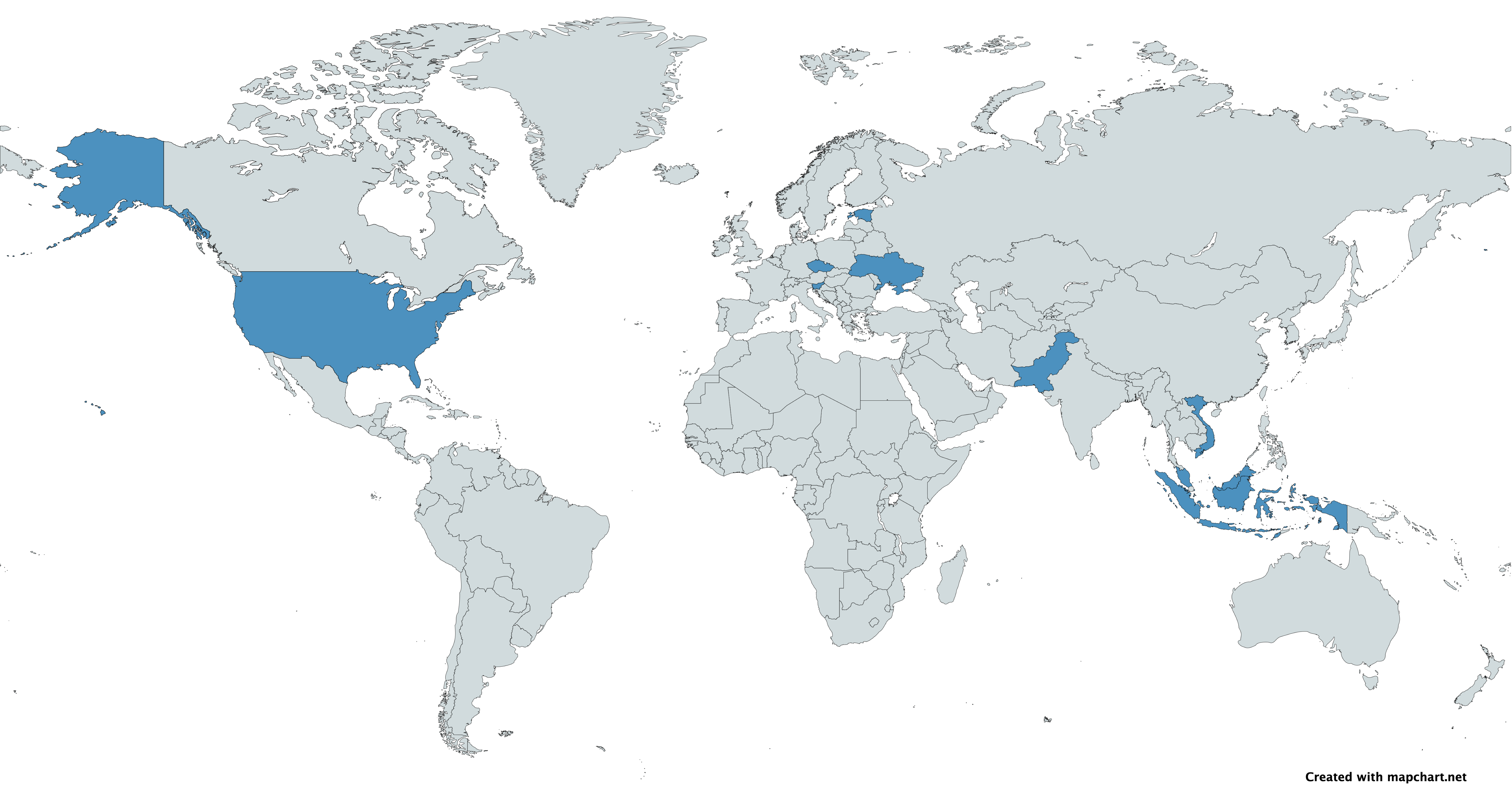
Map with VERA passive sensor users in blue

- Czech Republic
  - 2 Věra-S/M
  - 3 Věra NG (DPET version)
- Estonia
- Indonesia
- Malaysia
- Moldova: 1 VERA-NG on order 2024.
- Pakistan
- Slovakia
- Uganda
- (United Arab Emirates) UAE
- Ukraine: 4 VERA-NG were purchased by Netherlands for Ukraine in 2023.
- United States
- Vietnam: VERA-NG systems were imported and entered operation since 2015.
  - Local variant V-ELINT 18 Electronic Intelligence System (Vietnamese: Hệ thống Trinh sát điện tử thông minh, lit. 'Smart Electronic reconnaissance system') was developed and produced by Viettel. An unidentified number of Viettel-made systems that look visually identical to the imported VERA have been acquired and commissioned by the General Staff of the Vietnam People's Army Department of Electronic Warfare since 2021. The V-ELINT 18 is claimed as having equivalent functions & performance to the VERA-NG.

== See also ==
General topic

- ELINT/ESM

Similar systems

- Kolchuga – a similar system developed in the Soviet Union, manufactured in Ukraine
- Kopáč – the first generation Czech ESM TDOA system
- Ramona – the second generation Czech ESM TDOA system
- Tamara – the third generation Czech ESM TDOA system
- DPET – Deployable Passive ESM Tracker, Czech system based on upgraded technological core of Věra NG
- BORAP – a contemporary Czech ESM triangulation system for use at strategic level
- SRTP – a contemporary Czech ESM triangulation system for use at tactical level
- SDD – a contemporary Czech ESM triangulation system for use at strategic level
- PLESS – a contemporary Czech ESM triangulation system for use at ??? level
- YLC-20 - a Chinese development of Czech Tamara first revealed in 2006
