= Grill pan =

Grill pan can refer to several types of items:

- A frying pan with a series of parallel ridges used for cooking food with radiant heat on a stovetop, or with a metal grid in it. This is referred to as a "griddle pan" in the UK and Ireland. See Grill (cooking).
- A pan with a raised grill insert, used for cooking food under the grill part of a cooker. This is referred to as a "broiler pan" in the US and Canada. See grilling.
- The NATO reporting name for the fire control radar of the Russian SA-12 missile system
