= Rear-Admiral Eustațiu Sebastian-class corvette =

1989 class of Romanian Navy corvettes

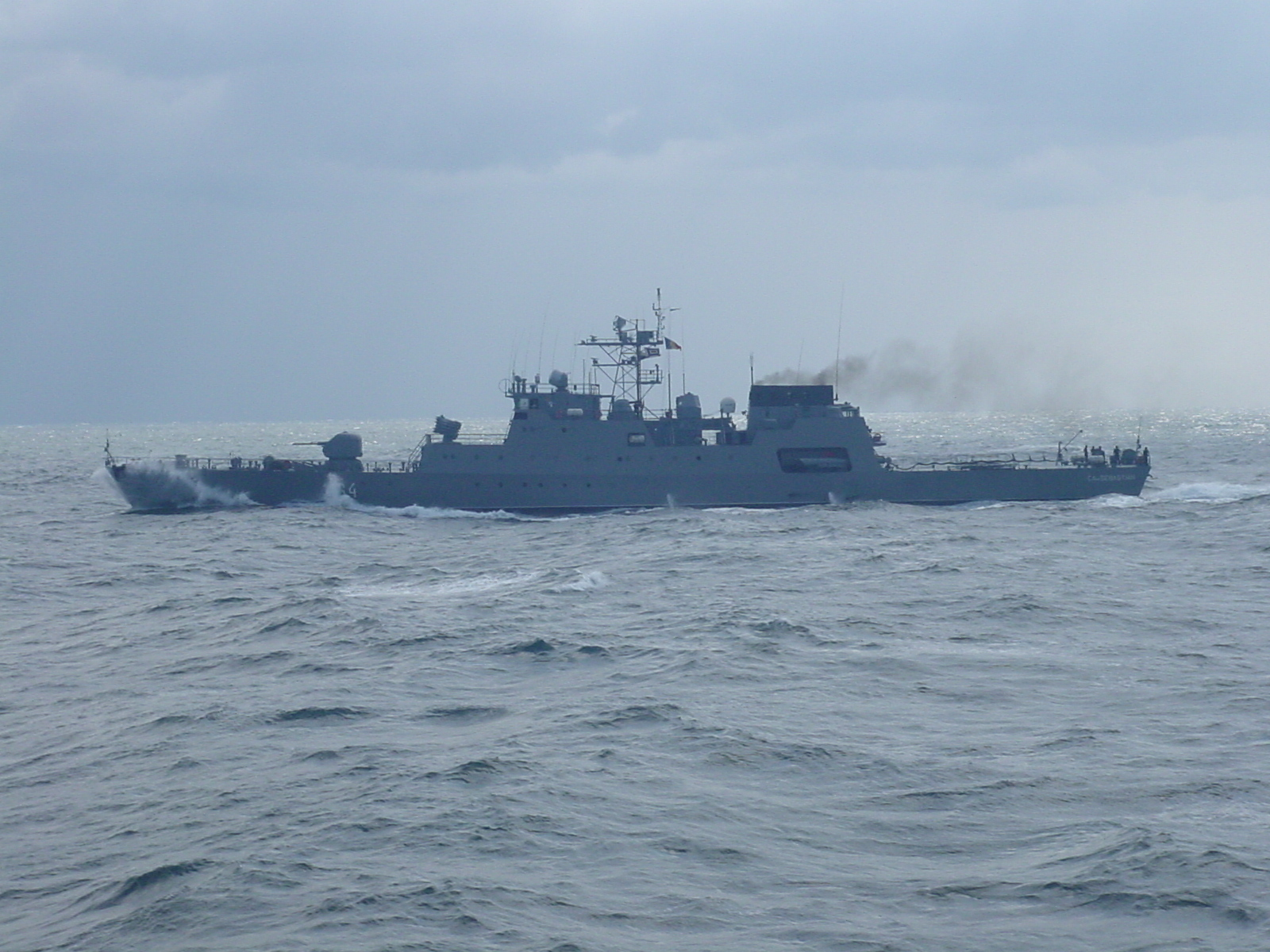
- The corvette Contraamiral Eustațiu Sebastian (Cvt 264) at sea.

Class overview
- Name: Rear-Admiral Eustațiu Sebastian class
- Operators: Romanian Naval Forces
- Preceded by: Tetal-I class
- Built: 1983–
- In commission: 1989–present
- Planned: 4
- Completed: 2
- Active: 2

General characteristics
- Type: Corvette
- Displacement: 1,480 long tons (1,504 t) standard; 1,600 long tons (1,626 t) full load
- Length: 93.00 m (305 ft 1 in) oa; 89.40 m (293 ft 4 in) pp
- Beam: 11.50 m (37 ft 9 in)
- Draught: 3.00 m (9 ft 10 in)
- Installed power: 16,000 bhp (12,000 kW)
- Propulsion: 4 shafts, 4 × diesel engines
- Speed: 24 kn (44 km/h; 28 mph)
- Complement: 77
- Sensors & processing systems: Radar: Strut Curve surface/air search, Bass Tilt fire control; Sonar: Hull mounted search and fire control
- Armament: 1 × AK-176 76 mm (3.0 in) gun; 4 × AK-630 30 mm CIWS; 4 × 533 mm torpedo tubes; 2 × RBU-6000 ASW rocket launchers
- Aviation facilities: Helicopter deck aft

The Rear-Admiral Eustațiu Sebastian-class corvette (also known as the Tetal-II or Modified Tetal class by NATO) is a series of two corvettes used by the Romanian Naval Forces for Black Sea duty. They have a displacement of 1,385 tonnes, a helicopter aft, and as main armament a 76 mm gun, torpedo tubes and anti-submarine warfare rocket launchers.

These ships are updated versions of the Admiral Petre Bărbuneanu (Tetal-I)-class corvette.

== Ships ==
- Contraamiral Eustațiu Sebastian (Cvt 264) Launched 1988 – In service since 1989
- Contraamiral Horia Macellariu (Cvt 265) – Launched 1994 – In service since 1996

Two other ships were laid down, but never finished. They are now awaiting disposal in Mangalia military harbor.

== See also ==
- Romanian Naval Forces
