= Fire-control radar =

Narrowly focused radar beam whose reflected signal is used to obtain a missile lock-on

United States Navy Fire Controlman (FC), USN rating badge

A fire-control radar (FCR) is a radar that is designed specifically to provide information (mainly target azimuth, elevation, range and range rate) to a fire-control system in order to direct weapons such that they hit a target. They are sometimes known as narrow beam radars, targeting radars, tracking radars, or in the UK, gun-laying radars. If the radar is used to guide a missile, it is often known as a target illuminator or illuminator radar.

A typical fire-control radar emits a narrow, intense beam of radio waves to ensure accurate tracking information and to minimize the chance of losing track of the target. This makes them less suitable for initial detection of the target, and FCRs are often partnered with a medium-range search radar to fill this role. In British terminology, these medium-range systems were known as tactical control radars.

Most modern radars have a track-while-scan capability, enabling them to function simultaneously as both fire-control radar and search radar. This works either by having the radar switch between sweeping the search sector and sending directed pulses at the target to be tracked, or by using a phased-array antenna to generate multiple simultaneous radar beams that both search and track.

== Operational phases ==
Fire-control radars operate in three different phases:

Designation or vectoring phase
The fire-control radar must be directed to the general location of the target due to the radar's narrow beam width. This phase is also called "lighting up". It ends when lock-on is acquired.
Acquisition phase
The fire-control radar switches to the acquisition phase of operation once the radar is in the general vicinity of the target. During this phase, the radar system searches in the designated area in a predetermined search pattern until the target is located or redesignated. This phase terminates when a weapon is launched.
Tracking phase
The fire-control radar enters into the track phase when the target is located. The radar system locks onto the target during this phase. This phase ends when the target is destroyed.

== Performance ==
The performance of a fire-control radar is determined primarily by two factors: radar resolution and atmospheric conditions. Radar resolution is the ability of the radar to differentiate between two targets closely located. The first, and most difficult, is range resolution, finding exactly how far is the target. To do this well, in a basic fire-control radar system, it must send very short pulses. Bearing resolution is typically ensured by using a narrow (one or two degree) beam width. Atmospheric conditions, such as moisture lapse, temperature inversion, and dust particles affect radar performance as well. Moisture lapse and temperature inversion often cause ducting, in which RF energy is bent as it passes through hot and cold layers. This can either extend or shorten the radar horizon, depending on which way the RF is bent. Dust particles, as well as water droplets, cause attenuation of the RF energy, resulting in a loss of effective range. In both cases, a lower pulse repetition frequency makes the radar less susceptible to atmospheric conditions.

== Countermeasures ==
Most fire-control radars have unique characteristics, such as radio frequency, pulse duration, pulse frequency and power. These can assist in identifying the radar, and therefore the weapon system it is controlling. This can provide valuable tactical information, like the maximum range of the weapon, or flaws that can be exploited, to combatants that are listening for these signs. During the Cold War Soviet fire control radars were often named and NATO pilots would be able to identify the threats present by the radar signals they received.

== Surface based ==
One of the first successful fire-control radars, the SCR-584, was used effectively and extensively by the Allies during World War II for anti-aircraft gun laying. Since World War II, the U.S. Army has used radar for directing anti-aircraft missiles including the MIM-23 Hawk, the Nike series and currently the MIM-104 Patriot.

== Ship based ==
Examples of fire-control radars currently in use by the United States Navy:

- Mk 95 — Continuous Wave Illuminator (NATO Sea sparrow Surface Missile System)
- Mk 92 — Combined Antenna System (Mk 75 Gun, formerly SM-1 missiles)
- AN/SPG-62 — Continuous Wave Illuminator (AEGIS)
- AN/SPQ-9B — Pulse Doppler (Mk 45 lightweight gun)

== Aircraft based ==
After World War II, airborne fire control radars have evolved from the simpler gun and rocket laying AN/APG-36 system used in the F-86D to the active electronically scanned array-based AN/APG-81 of the F-35 Lightning II.

== See also ==
- Index of aviation articles
- Radar configurations and types
- List of radars
- List of military electronics of the United States
- Ship gun fire-control system
