= Kopáč passive sensor =

Kopáč (the word means "digger" in Czech) was an early electronic warfare support measures (ESM) system developed in Czechoslovakia in the early 1960s that used measurements of time difference of arrival (TDOA) of pulses at three sites to accurately detect and track airborne emitters. The system used the principle of multilateration and was capable of simultaneously manually tracking up to six targets. It was first deployed in 1963 and was also known by its serial number, PRP-1. The initials PRP come from the Czech "Přesný radiotechnický pátrač", meaning "Accurate Radiotechnical Locator", the name comes from "Korelační pátrač", meaning "Correlation Locator".

The concept was derived by Vlastimil Pech and patented in Czechoslovak classified patent 771 on November 13, 1961. Subsequent related patents 830, 852 and 859 were filed by Vladimír Zárybnický in 1962. The system used analogue signal processing and operated in D, G/H and I/J bands, as well as specifically against IFF and TACAN transponders at 1090 MHz.

It remained in service with the Czechoslovak People's Army until 1979.

== See also ==
- ELINT/ESM
- Ramona – the second generation Czech ESM TDOA system
- Tamara – the third generation Czech ESM TDOA system
- VERA – the current and fourth generation Czech ESM TDOA system
- Kolchuga – a similar system developed in Ukraine

== Literature ==
- Jiří Hofman, Jan Bauer: Tajemství radiotechnického pátrače Tamara [The Secret of Radiotechnical Sensor Tamara], 2003, ISBN 80-86645-02-9, in Czech. Describes three generations of the sensors: PRP 1 (Kopáč, 1964), Ramona (1979) and Tamara (1989). Jiří Hofman worked in the development of the sensors.
