= Tamara passive sensor =

Czechoslovak aircraft detection system

Tamara was the third generation Czechoslovak electronic support measures (ESM) system that used measurements of time difference of arrival (TDOA) of pulses at three or four sites to accurately detect and track airborne emitters by multilateration. Tamara's designations were KRTP-86 and KRTP-91 and it carried the NATO reporting name of Trash Can. The designation was derived from the Czech phrase "Komplet Radiotechnického Průzkumu" meaning "Radiotechnical Reconnaissance Set". It was claimed to be the only one in the world able to detect military "invisible aircraft".

== History ==
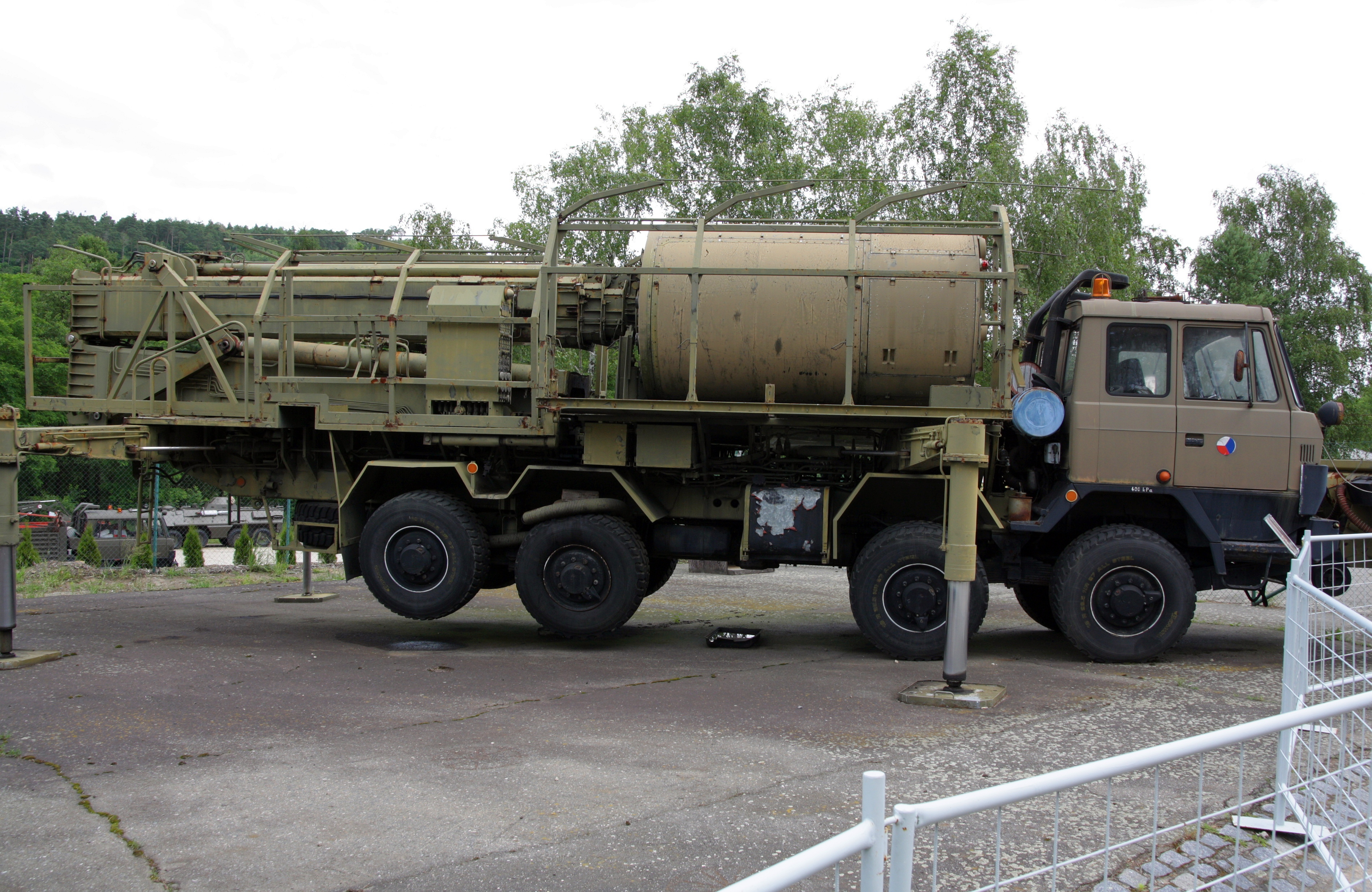
KRTP-86 Tamara on Tatra T815 in Military Museum Lešany

Development of Tamara by the state-run company Tesla in Pardubice began in 1981 and continued until 1983. Tests of a mobile system began in September 1984 through to 1985. It was finally deployed in 1987 following acceptance tests in October of that year. In 1991 the baseline KRTP-86 Tamara was superseded in production by the improved KRTP-91 Tamara-M.

== Appearance ==
Unlike its predecessors, Tamara was a mobile system deployed on eight large Tatra T815 trucks and mounted upon a powerful 25 m hydraulic mast. Setup was completely automated and claimed to be put into operation in twenty minutes from the arrival at a site.

== Mode of operation ==
The deployed system typically comprises a central site (containing the signal processing equipment and an ESM receiver) and two or three side sites containing only an ESM receiver. The side sites relay the signals received to the central site over a point-to-point microwave link. The central site uses the known propagation delay from the side sites to estimate the TDOA of the pulses at each site. The TDOA of a pulse between one side site and the central site locates the target on a hyperboloid. A second side site provides a second TDOA and hence a second hyperboloid. The intersection of these two hyperboloids places the target on a line, providing a 2D measurement of the target's location (no height). A third site provides a third hyperboloid and hence a measurement of height.

Tamara could automatically track 23 radar and 48 IFF targets simultaneously. Its frequency band is 0.8-1.8 GHz. The nominal range of the system is 450 km, and it is generally limited by the radio horizon. It provides surveillance over a sector of approximately 100 degrees, with the later KRTP-91 system offering a wider 120 degree sector of surveillance.

== Exports ==
Tesla built a total of 23 units, with 15 KRTP-86 Tamara and 4 KRTP-91 Tamara-M units exported to the former Soviet Union, as well as a single KRTP-86 Tamara unit to the German Democratic Republic. The East German Tamara unit was used by the Bundeswehr after the German Reunification until 2010.

== Related systems ==
Tamara was the successor of the Kopáč and Ramona. It has been succeeded by the VERA family of sensors.

== See also ==
- ELINT/ESM
- Kopáč - the first generation Czech ESM TDOA system
- Ramona - the second generation Czech ESM TDOA system
- VERA - the current and fourth generation Czech ESM TDOA system

== Literature ==
- Jiří Hofman, Jan Bauer: Tajemství radiotechnického pátrače Tamara [The Secret of Radiotechnical Sensor Tamara], 2003, ISBN 80-86645-02-9, in Czech. Describes three generations of the sensors: PRP 1 (1964), Ramona (1979) and Tamara (1989). Jiří Hofman worked in the development of the sensors.
