= Ramona passive sensor =

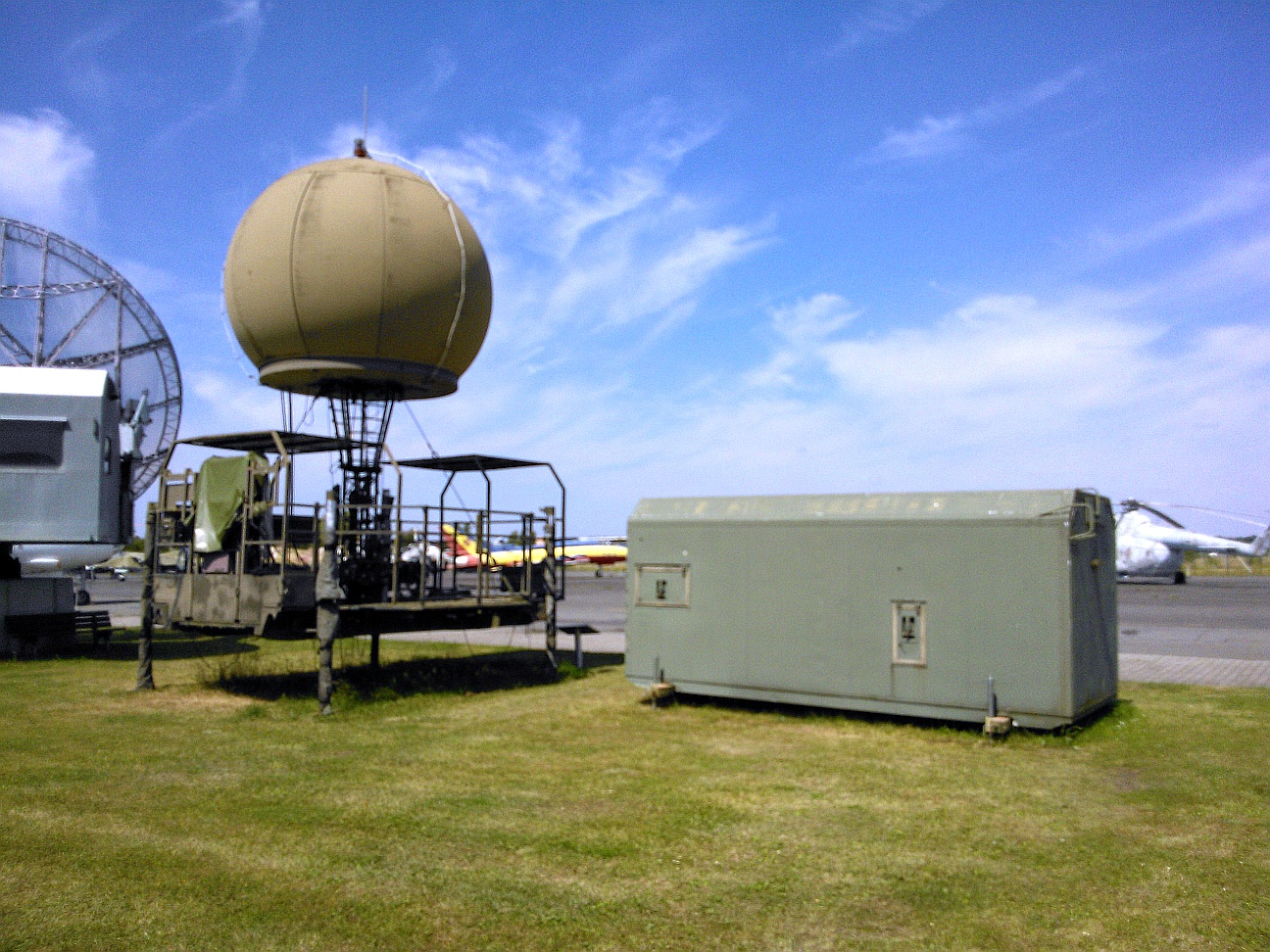
Ramona KRTP-81

Ramona was the second generation Czechoslovak electronic support measures (ESM) system that uses measurements of time difference of arrival (TDOA) of pulses at three or four sites to accurately detect and track airborne emitters by multilateration.

== History ==
Ramona's designation was KRTP-81 and it carried the NATO reporting name of Soft Ball. The serial number was derived from the Czech phrase "Komplet radiotechnického průzkumu" meaning "Radiotechnical Reconnaissance Set". A later upgraded version was designated KRTP-81M. Ramona was deployed in 1979 and could semi-automatically track 20 targets simultaneously. It superseded Kopáč.

== Appearance ==
Each receiver comprised a large spherical radome mounted on the top of a 25 m fixed mast. This radome, made of identical segments of polyurethane foam, contained the radio antennas and the microwave components, intermediate frequency preamplifiers and the two-way communications equipment for communicating between central and side sites. At first glance the system bore a striking resemblance to typical Eastern European water towers.

== Mode of operation ==
The deployed system typically comprises a central site (containing the signal processing equipment and an ESM receiver) and two or three side sites containing only an ESM receiver. The side sites relay the signals received to the central site over a point-to-point microwave link. The central site uses the known propagation delay from the side sites to estimate the TDOA of the pulses at each site. The TDOA of a pulse between one side site and the central site locates the target on a hyperboloid. A second side site provides a second TDOA and hence a second hyperboloid. The intersection of these two hyperboloids places the target on a line, providing a 2D measurement of the target's location (no height).

Ramona operated over the frequency range of 0.8-18 GHz and provided surveillance over a sector of approximately 100 degrees. System deployment was complex and took between 4 and 12 hours. The system was transportable using thirteen Tatra T138 trucks.

== Exports ==
17 Ramona systems and 14 upgraded Ramona-M systems were built. Of these, 14 Ramona and 10 upgraded systems were exported to the Soviet Union. Of these, the system with serial number 104 was deployed by the Soviet Union in North Korea. Other systems were exported to the German Democratic Republic. Syria received four (three Ramona-M) between 1981-94. One of these systems was deployed to Djebel Baruk in Lebanon. This site was first attacked by Israeli Air Force and then occupied by IDF during June 1982.

== See also ==
- ELINT/ESM
- Kopáč - the first generation Czech ESM TDOA system
- Tamara - the third generation Czech ESM TDOA system
- VERA - the current and fourth generation Czech ESM TDOA system
- Kolchuga - a similar system developed in Ukraine

== Literature ==
- Jiří Hofman, Jan Bauer: Tajemství radiotechnického pátrače Tamara [The Secret of Radiotechnical Sensor Tamara], 2003, ISBN 80-86645-02-9, in Czech. Describes three generations of the sensors: PRP 1 (1964), Ramona (1979) and Tamara (1989). Jiří Hofman worked in the development of the sensors.
- Peter Emmett: Silent Trackers: The specter of passive surveillance in the information age, in Air Power, summer 2002 issue
