= Tesla a.s. =

Czech manufacturer of electronical and electrical equipment

TESLA a.s.

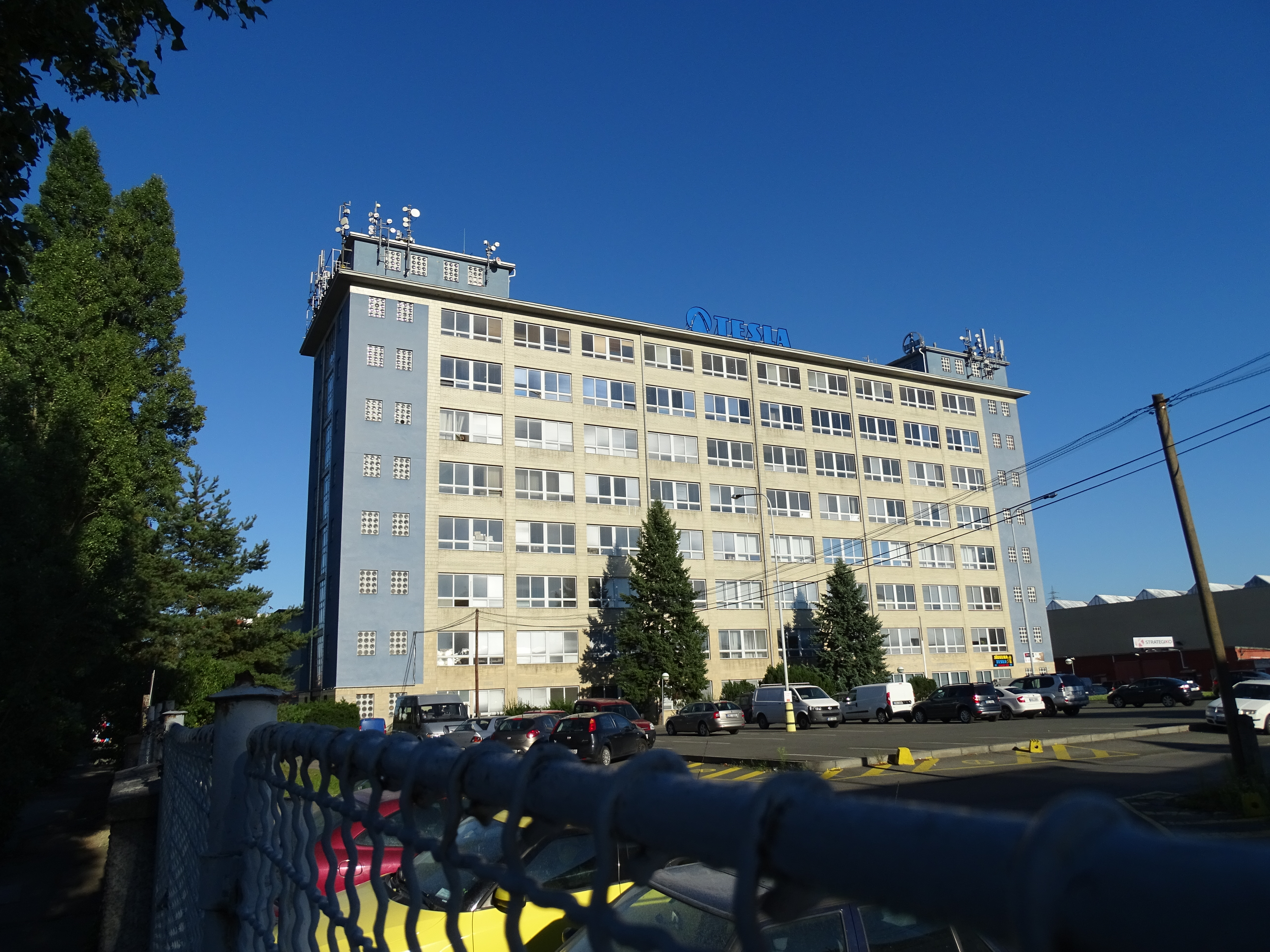
- Former headquarters in Hloubětín
- Type: Public
- Industry: Manufacturing
- Founded: 18 January 1921; 105 years ago as Elektra; 7 March 1946; 80 years ago as TESLA Strašnice; 1 January 1991; 35 years ago as a public company
- Headquarters: Prague, Czech Republic
- Products: Electronics
- Website: www.tesla-electronics.eu/en/

TESLA a.s. is a Czech manufacturer and supplier of special radio communication and security electrical engineering for military and commercial use. The name was originally used by a state-owned conglomerate that was the monopoly producer of electronic appliances and components in the former Socialist Republic of Czechoslovakia. The conglomerate was founded in 1946 and ran until 1991, when it was privatised. The Tesla name is used by its successor company and former subsidiaries in the Czech Republic and Slovakia.

In 2011, the Czech company Inter-Sat Ltd. acquired the license for the Tesla brand name from TESLA a.s. to sell household appliances and consumer electronics with different logo in Europe, mostly in Central and Southeastern countries.

== Company ==
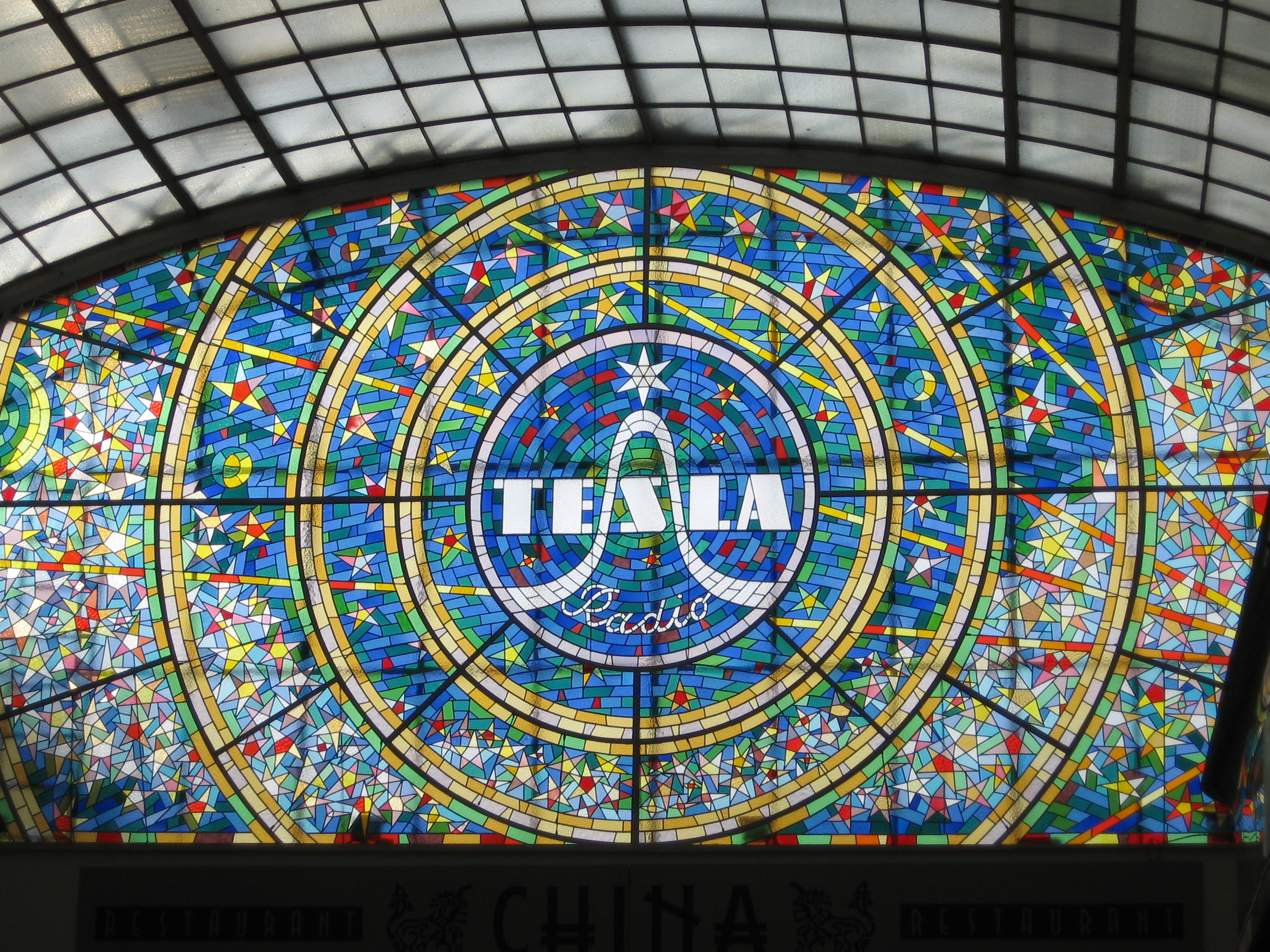
Tesla Radio logo in a stained glass window in the Světozor Passage in Prague

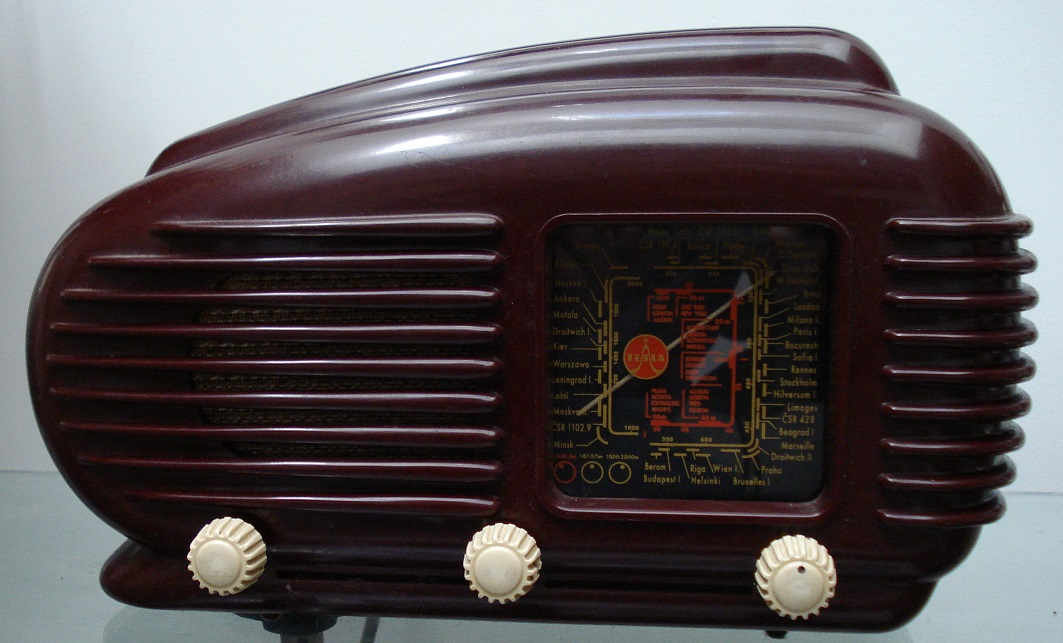
Tesla 308U Talisman radio (1953)

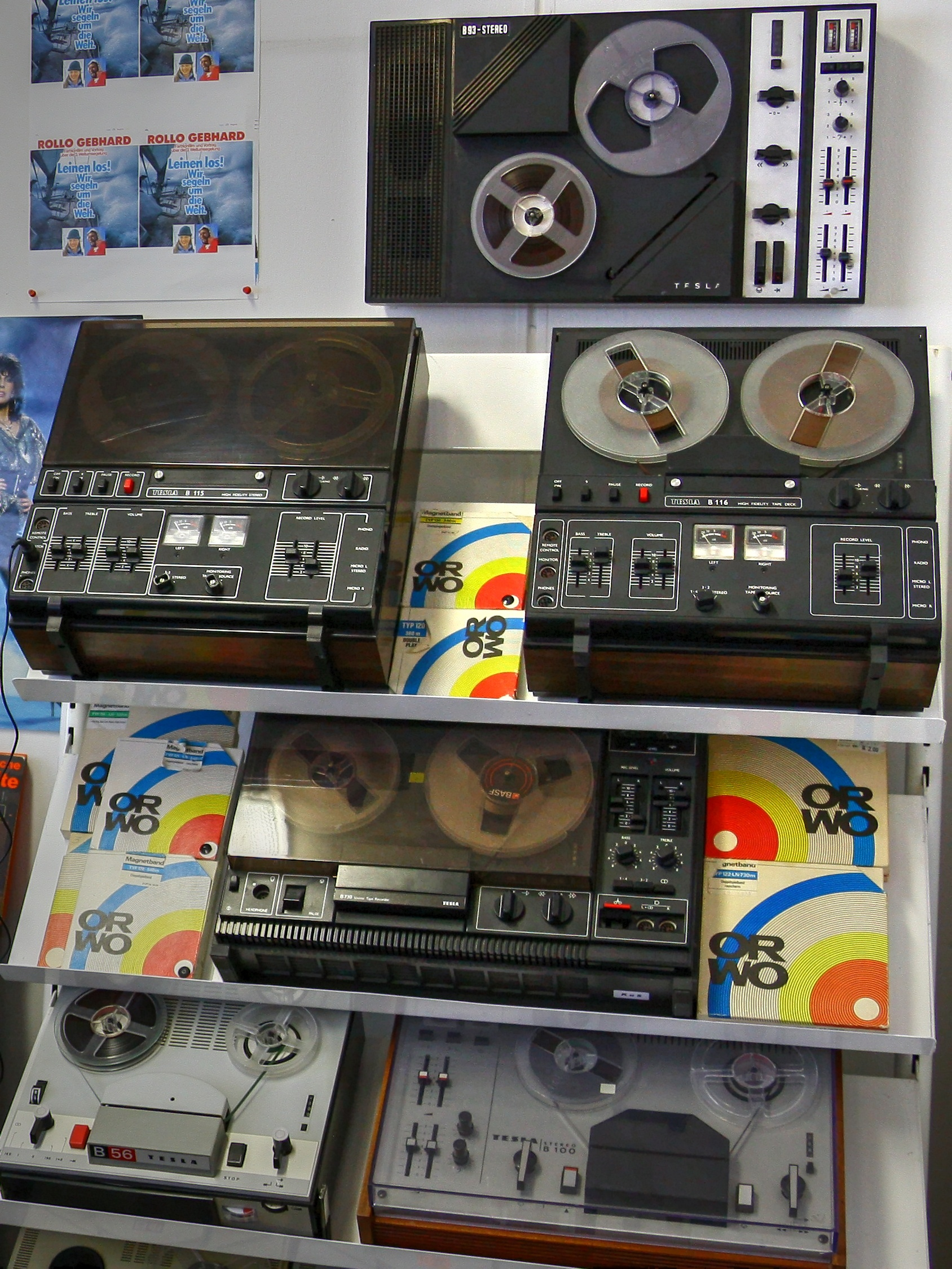
Tesla tape recorders (B93, B115, B116, B730, B56 and B100) in Radebeul museum

The company was established as Elektra on 18 January 1921 and renamed Tesla on 7 March 1946. A founding ceremony took place on 10 August 1946 at the Mikrofon Factory in Strašnice attended by government ministers from Czechoslovakia and Yugoslavia. It was named after the pioneer scientist Nikola Tesla, who briefly studied in Prague, but when the association with a Serbian American became politically inconvenient it was explained as abbreviation from TEchnika SLAboproudá, which means "low-current technology".

Tesla had several production locations, including those at Liptovský Hrádok, Hradec Králové, Pardubice, Žďár nad Sázavou, Bratislava, and Nižná. Some of them became independent state-owned companies.

After the fall of communism in Czechoslovakia, Tesla struggled to compete with firms at home and abroad, which resulted in dramatic downsizing and privatization of the majority of its stores and production facilities. Tesla's logo is a rare sight in the present-day Czech Republic and Slovakia, as only a few of its subsidiaries have survived. One of its former subsidiaries, the Slovak JJ Electronic in Čadca is known for its production of vacuum tubes and SEV Litovel produces high-end turntables for the Austrian Pro-Ject company.

The company name survived as Tesla a.s., a private company whose shares trade on the Prague stock exchange. Tesla a.s. manufactures of radio and security equipment for military and commercial use. Tesla a.s. took a series of legal cases against the American company Tesla, Inc. (formerly Tesla Motors, Inc.), resulting in an agreement in October 2010, establishing a coexistence of Tesla trademarks and regulating relationships between the two companies.

After a three-year period in which an Irish-owned financial company was the majority shareholder in Tesla a.s. a controlling interest was acquired by Inter-Sat Ltd of Brno in 2011. Tesla a.s. sells set-top boxes, antennas, robotic vacuum cleaners, soundbars, motion detectors and multifunctional pressure cookers. In 2015 the company added batteries for home and industrial use to its product range.

In 2022, the majority shareholder of Tesla a.s. became the international group IC Group, which secured the transaction for The Royal Invest Fund of Kelantan founded by Sultan Muhammad V of Kelantan.

== Products ==
The original Tesla concern developed a wide product range including televisions, radio receivers, transistors, integrated circuits, visual display units, loudspeakers, gramophones, cassette decks, Compact Disc players and videocassette recorders. However, the quantity produced was often insufficient for industrial customers and some products became obsolete because they were not updated; e.g. one particular type of diode was manufactured for over 30 years without modification. Some products were comparable with those from international producers e.g. silicon controlled rectifiers (SCRs) or power transistors and Tesla exported them to other countries in Eastern Europe. A few products were exported to western countries, for example, the NC 470 turntable rebranded as the NAD 5120, and the NC 450, NC 452, NC 430 turntables sold under the tradename Lenco.

In 1953, the production of the first Czechoslovak television, the Tesla 4001A, began in Strašnice. The first Czechoslovak color television, the Tesla 4401A, began manufacturing in 1974.

The best-known Tesla products internationally were the 308U Talisman bakelite radio designed by Igor Didov of Tesla Bratislava and made by several Tesla company branches between 1953 and 1958 and the Sonet duo reel-to-reel tape recorder (1959–1965). Tesla was also known for its KRTP-86 Tamara military passive radar (TESLA Pardubice, 1986), which was claimed to be the only one in the world able to detect stealth aircraft.

Tesla Brno also manufactured electron microscopes. Its BS 242 tabletop microscope was developed by a team led by Armin Delong and won a gold medal at Expo 58 in Brussels. More than 1,000 instruments were manufactured over twenty years.

== Gallery ==
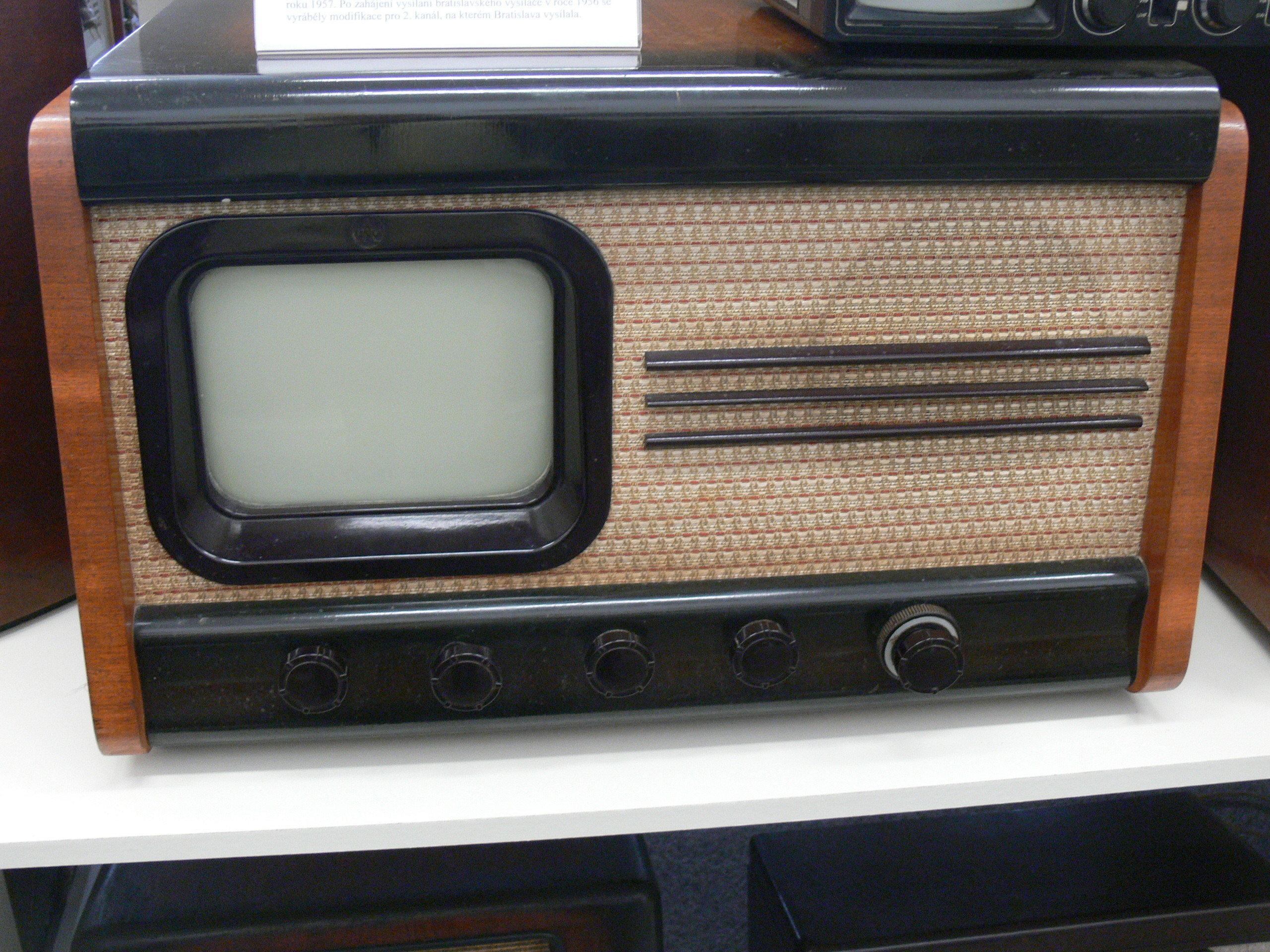
Tesla 4001A, the first Czechoslovak television (1953)

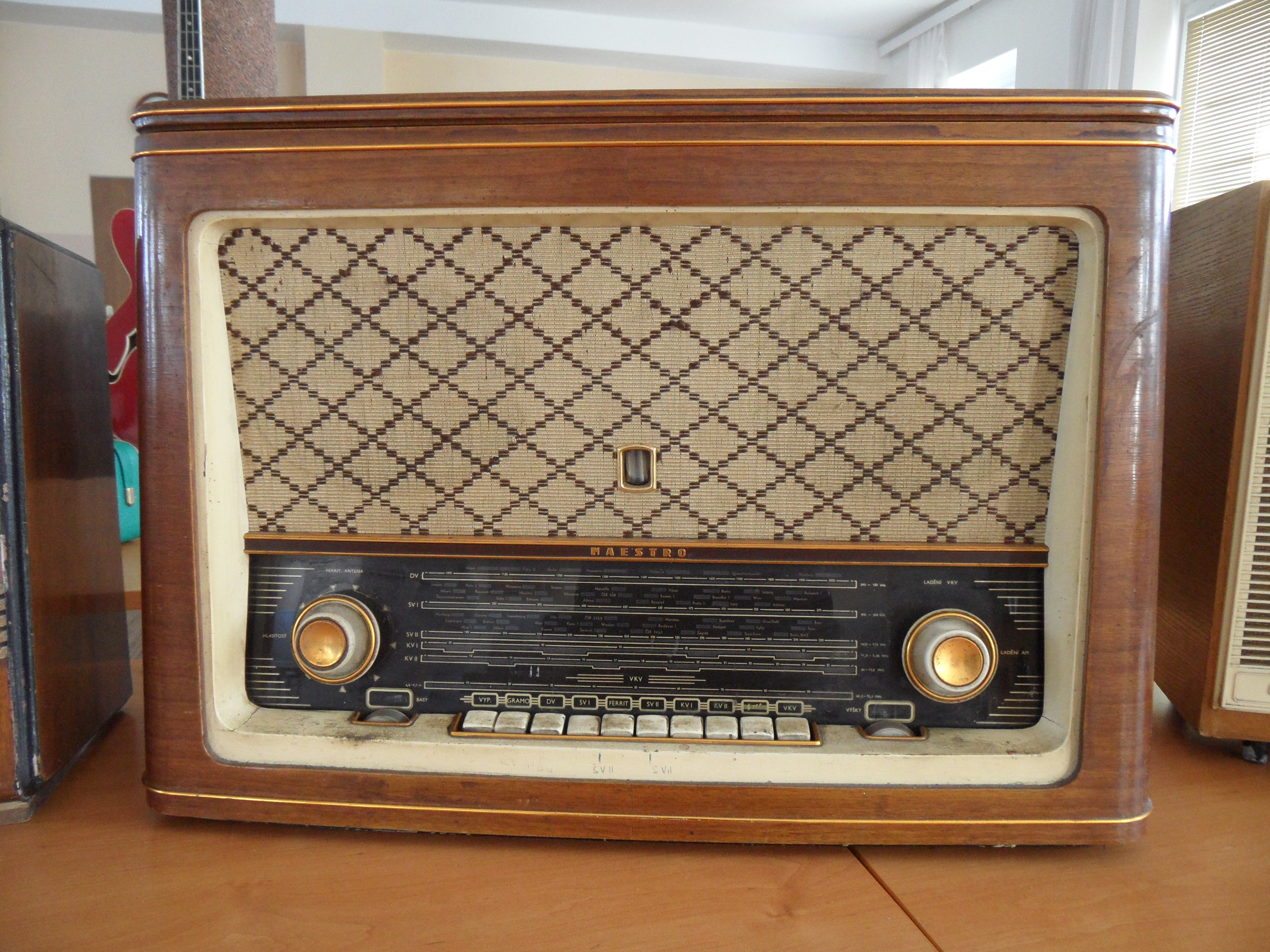
Tesla Maestro (1958)

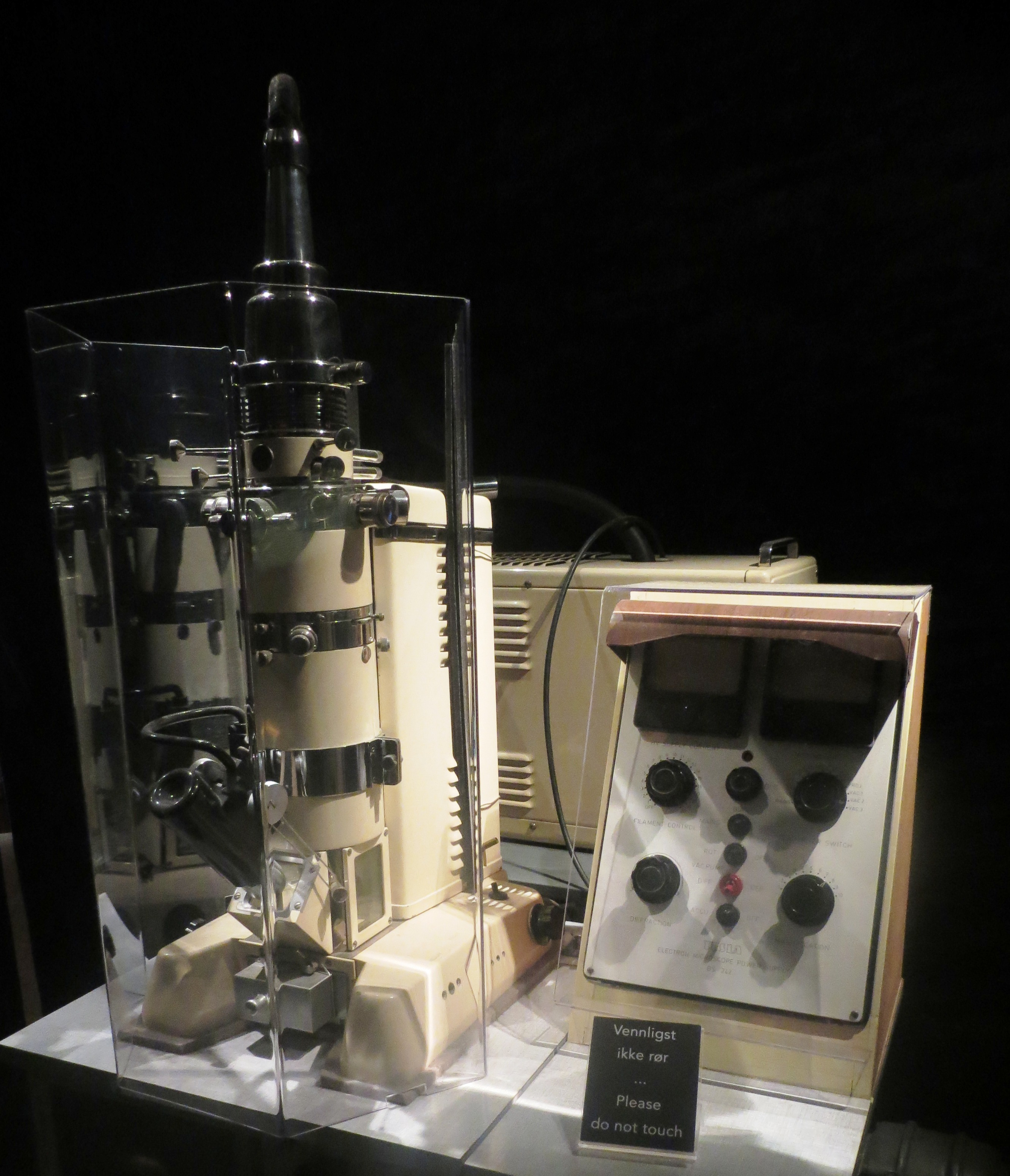
Tesla BS 242 electron microscope (1958)

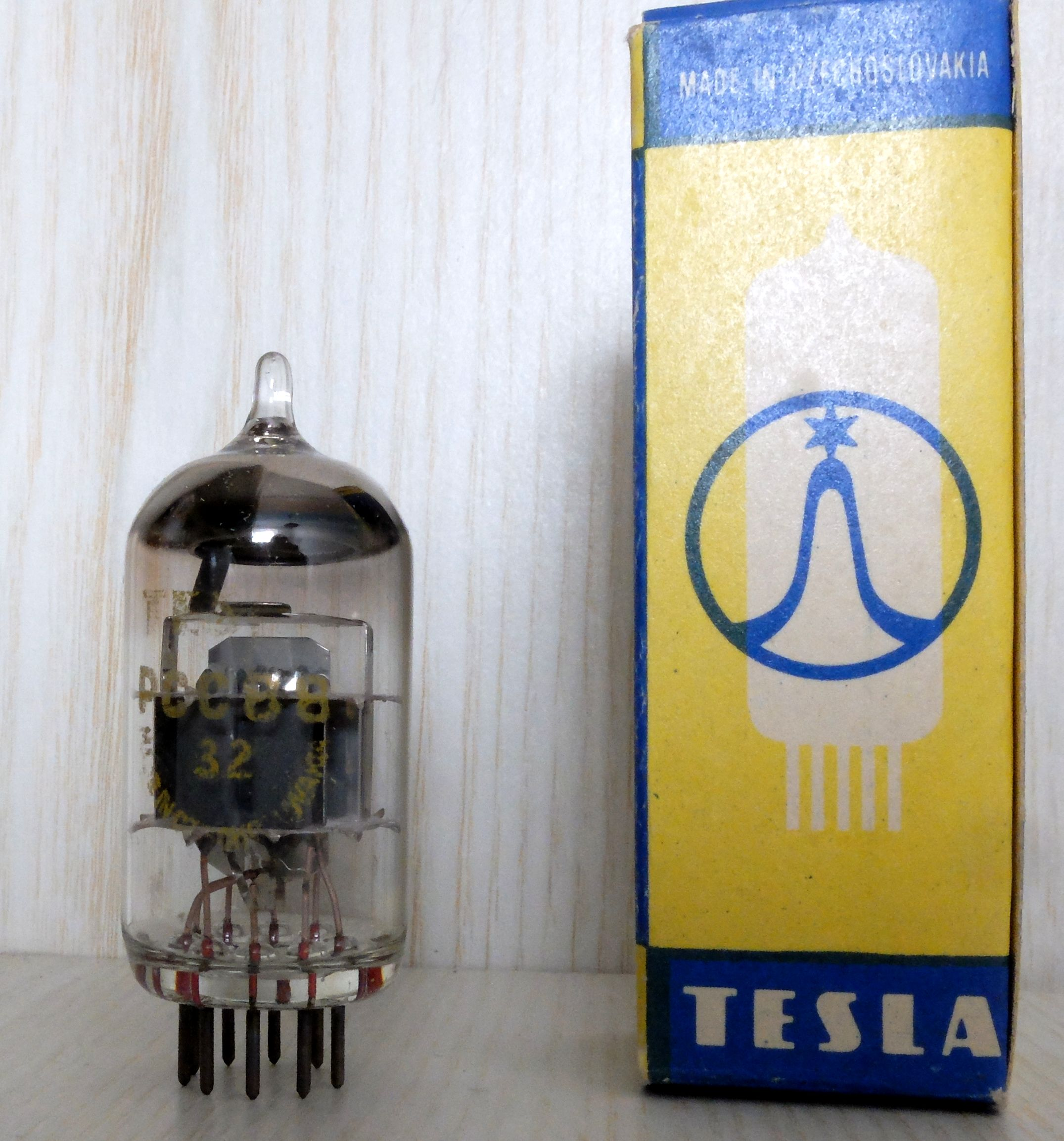
Tesla PCC88 vacuum tube

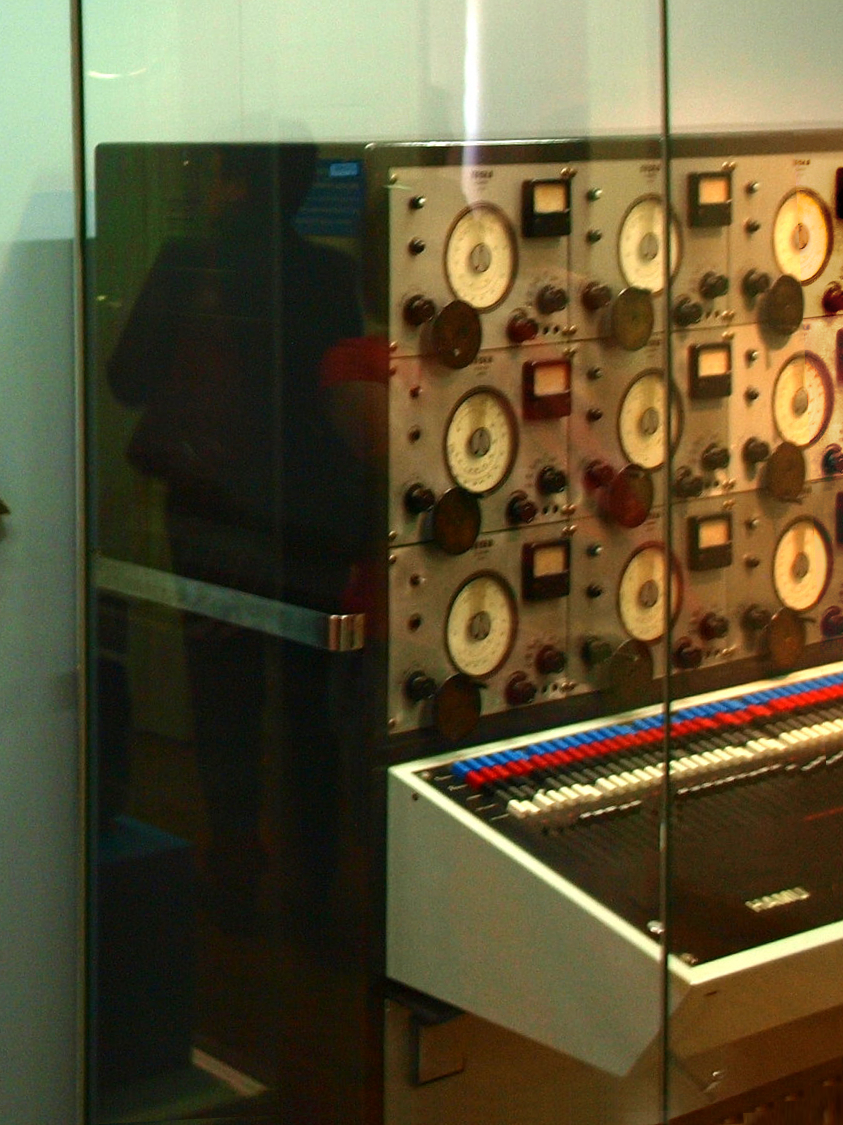
VÚRT synthesizer with twelve Tesla electronic oscillators

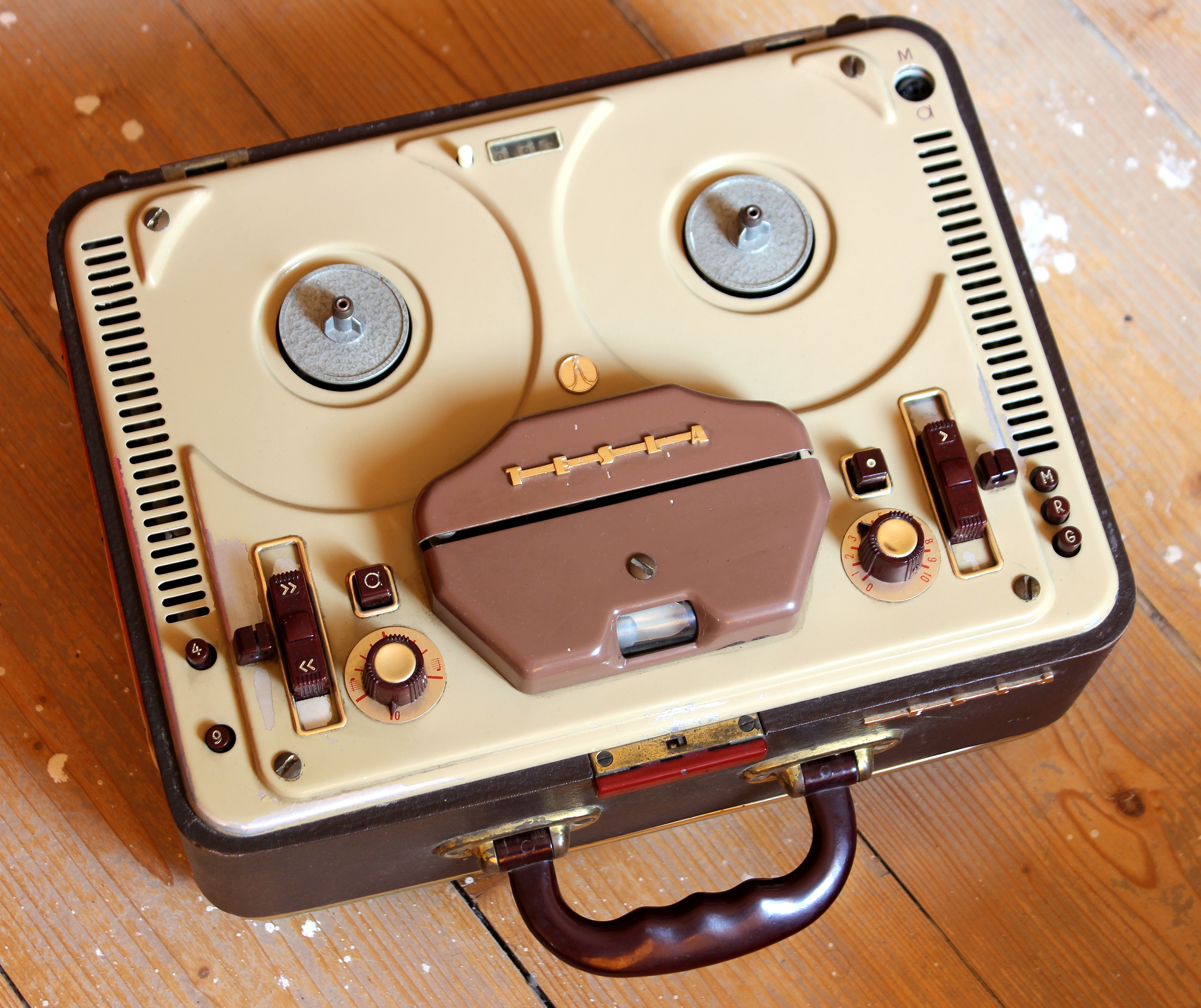
Portable reel tape recorder Sonet Duo (1959)

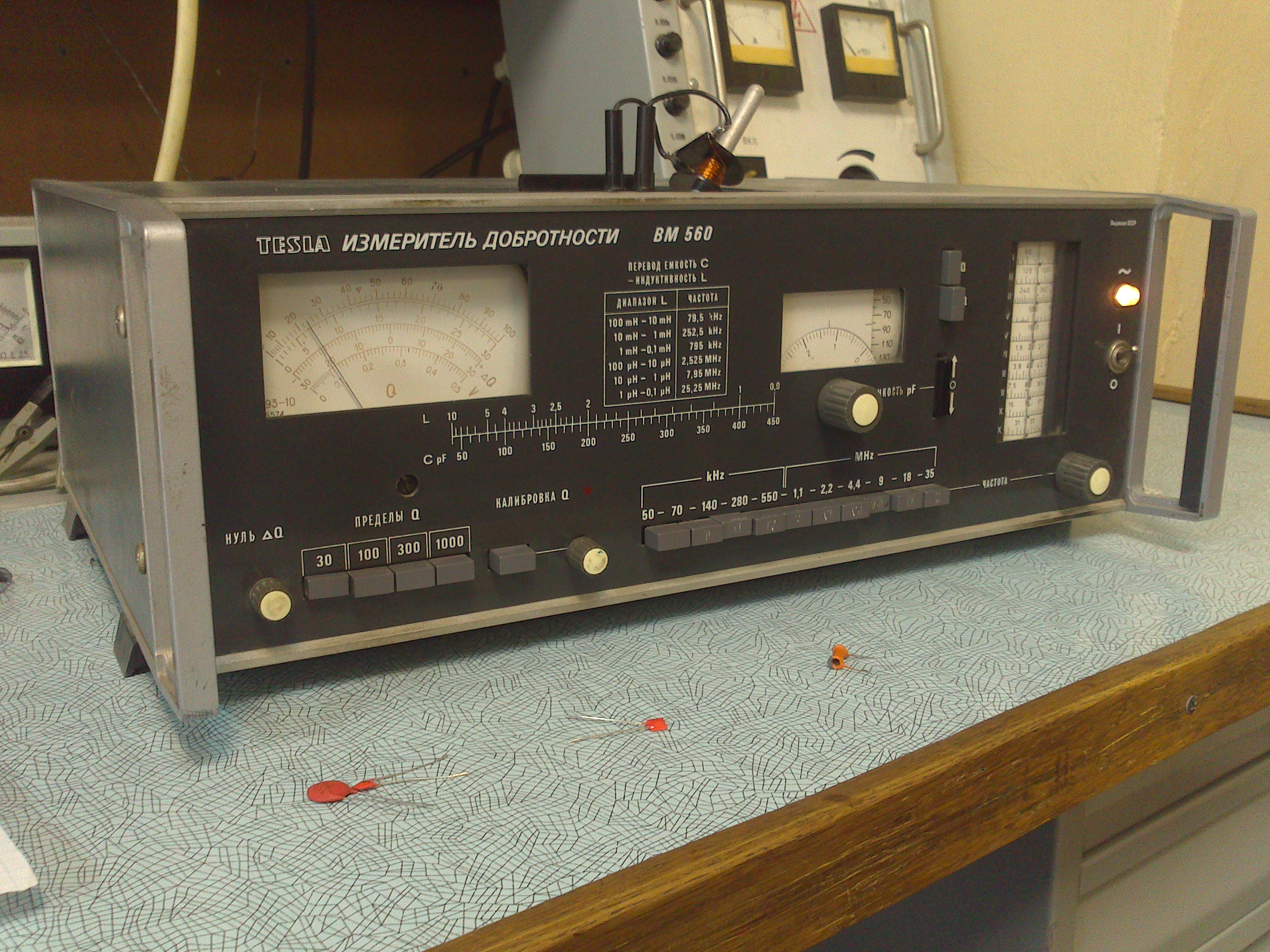
Tesla BM 560 Q meter (1977)

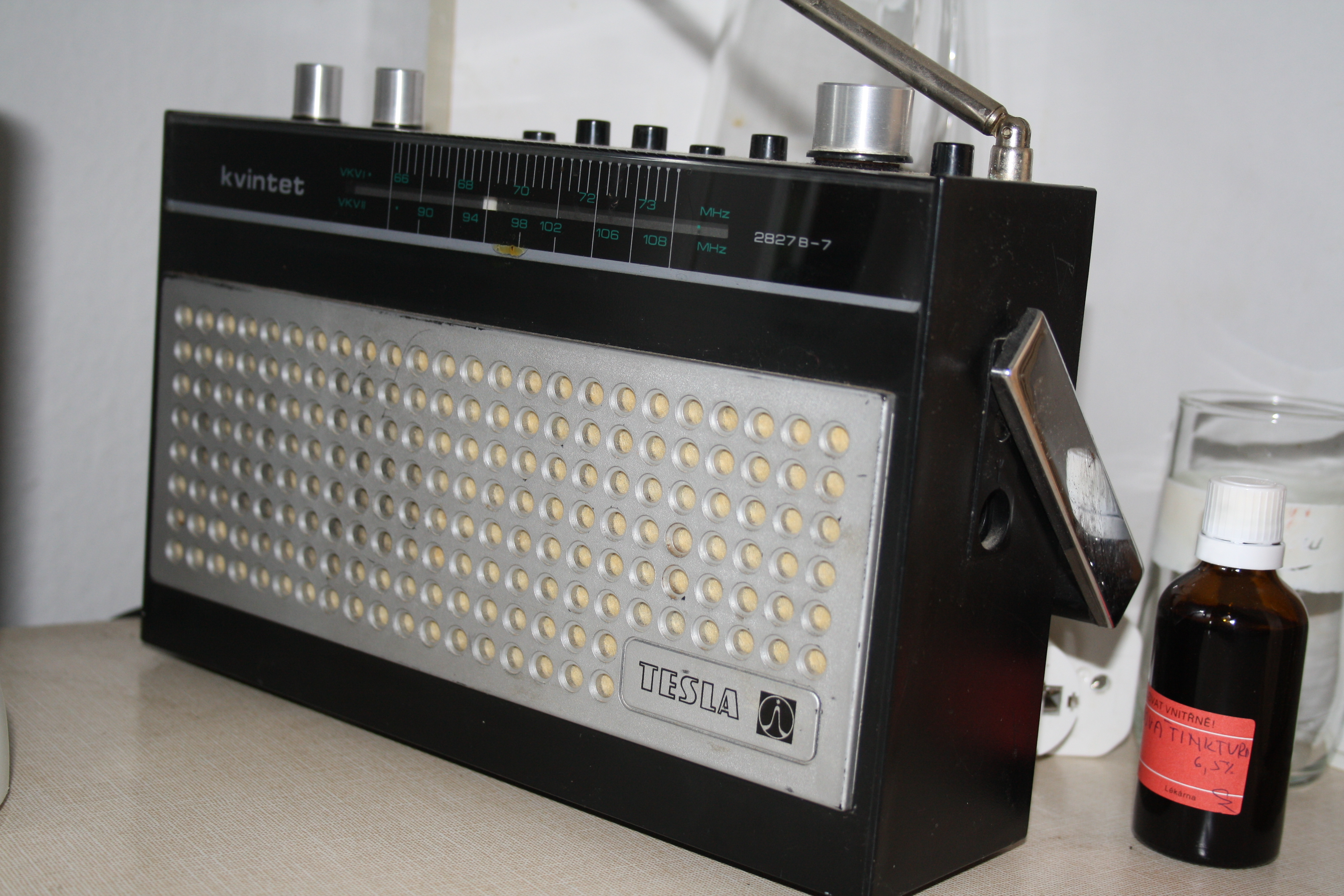
Tesla Kvintet radio receiver (1978)

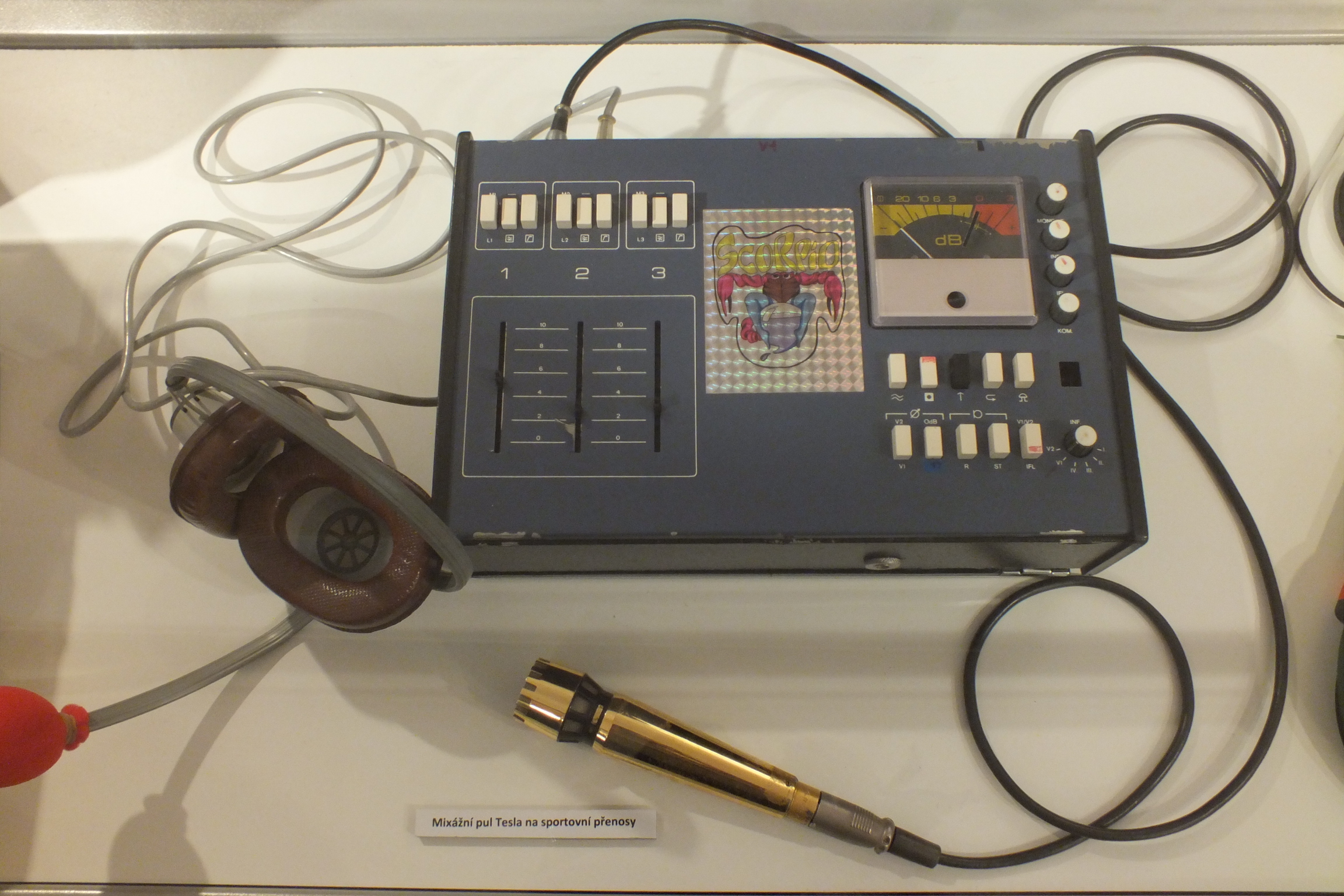
Tesla ERT 032 audio mixer used for sport broadcasting

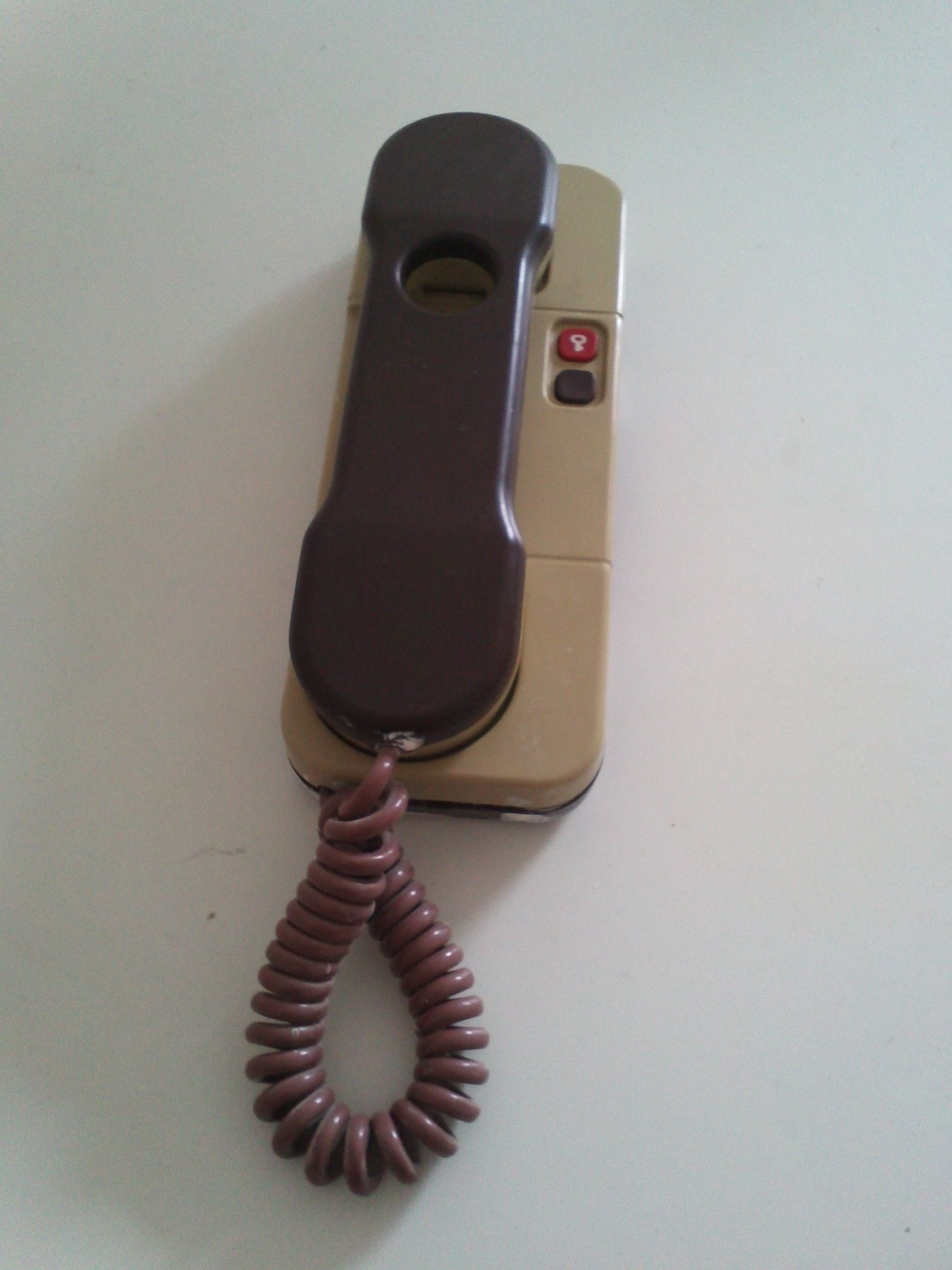
Tesla DT 85 home telephone

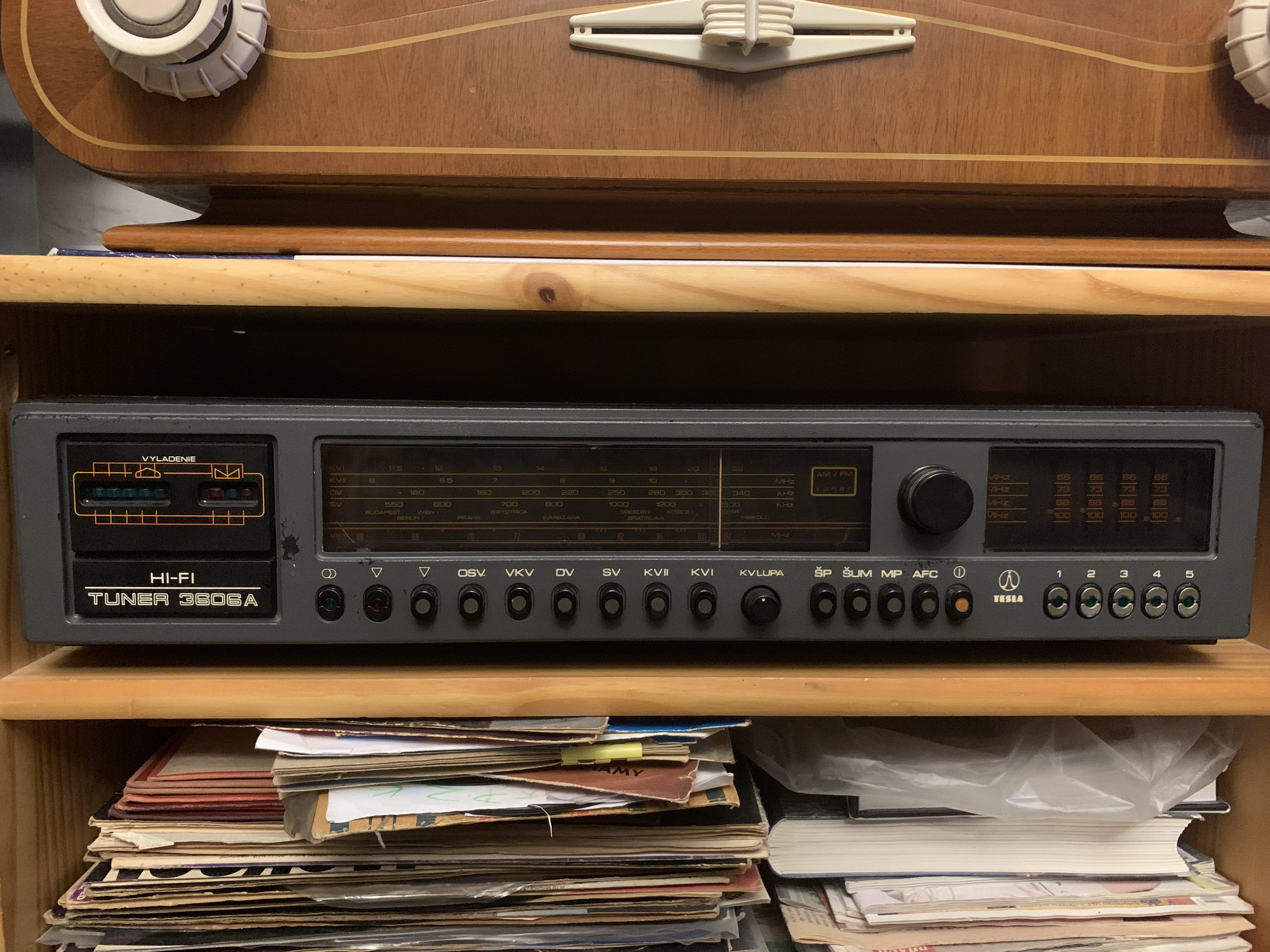
Tesla 3606A tuner (1981)

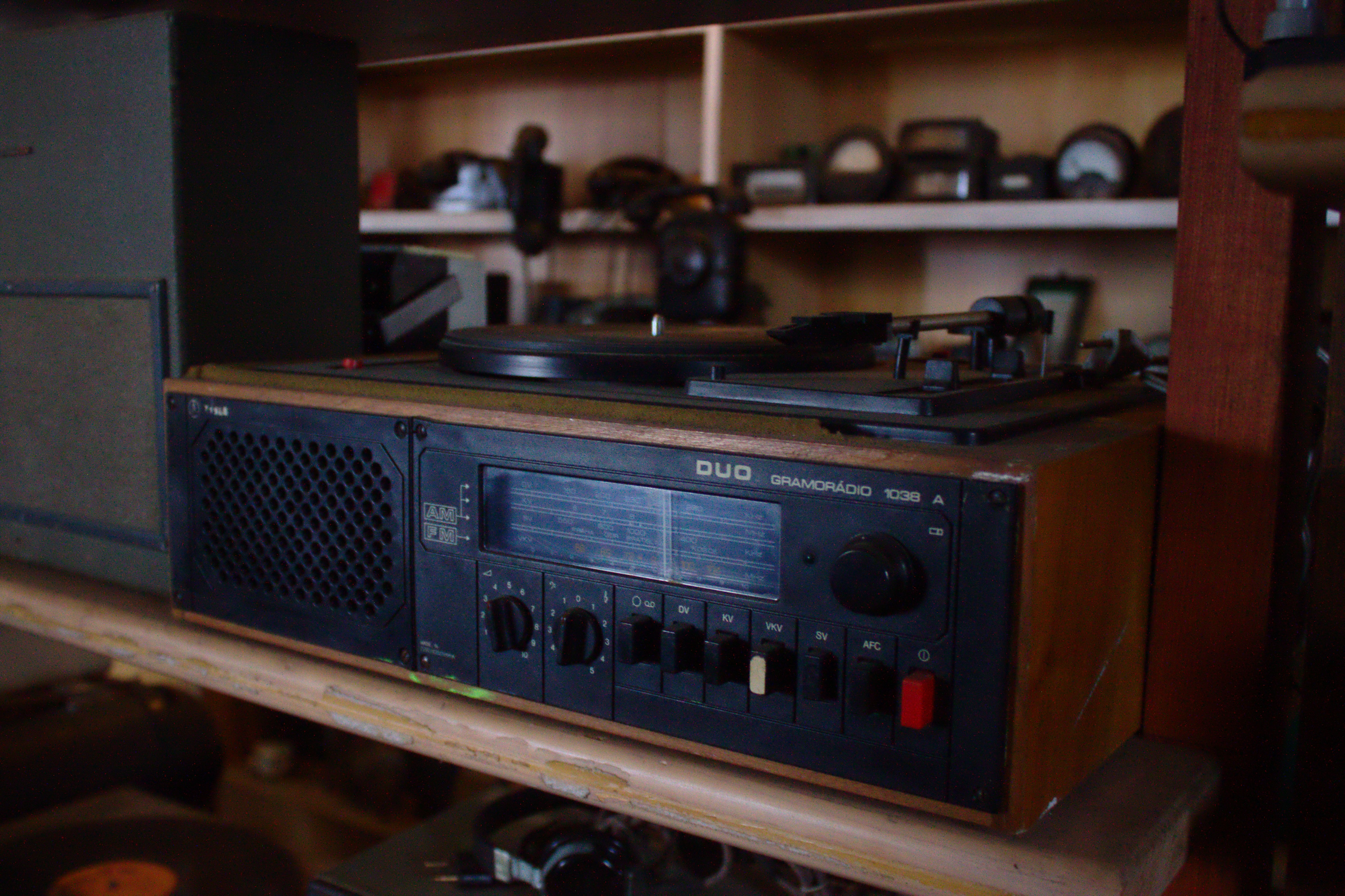
Tesla 1038A Duo radio gramophone (1984)

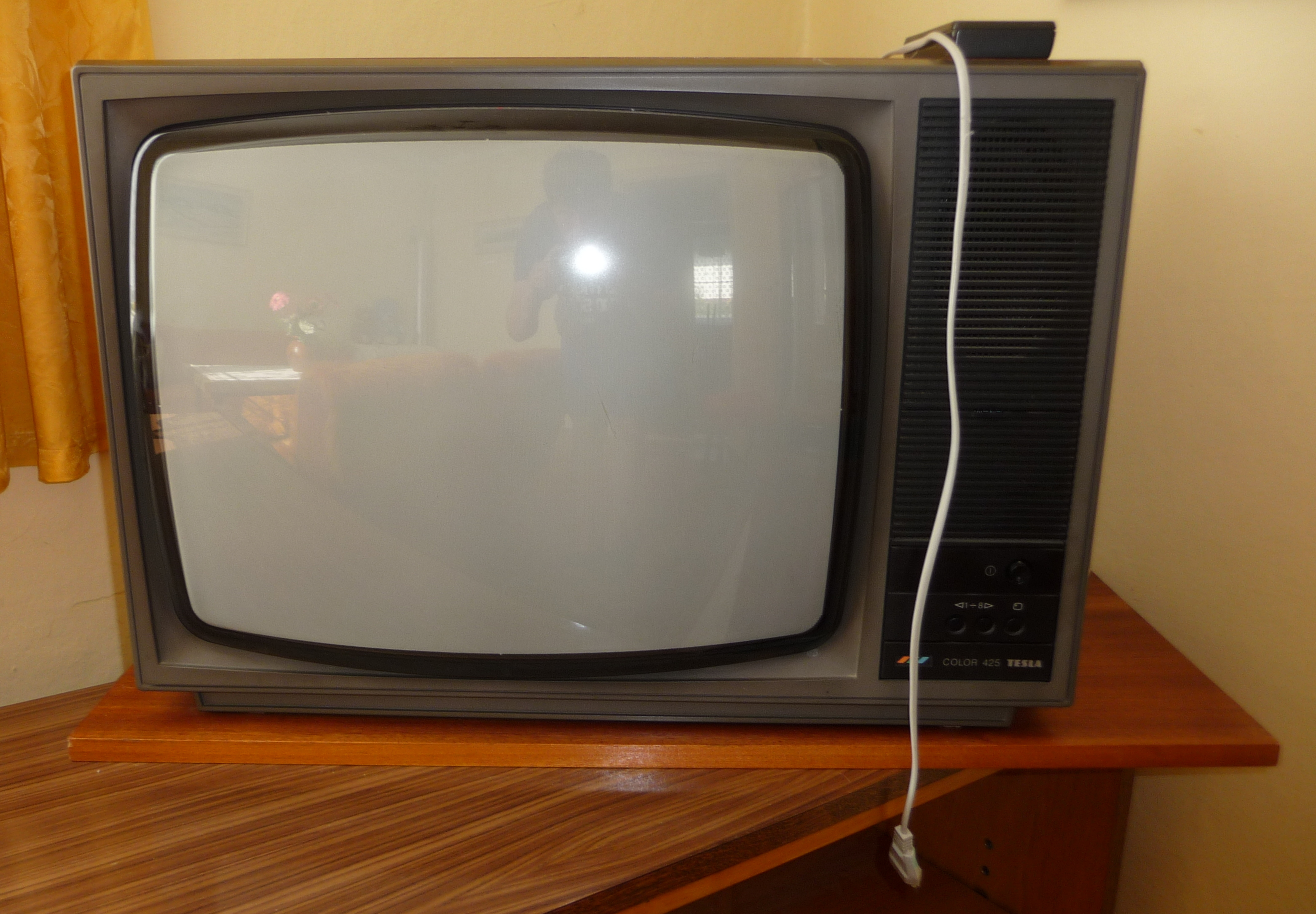
Tesla 4425A "Color 425" (1986)

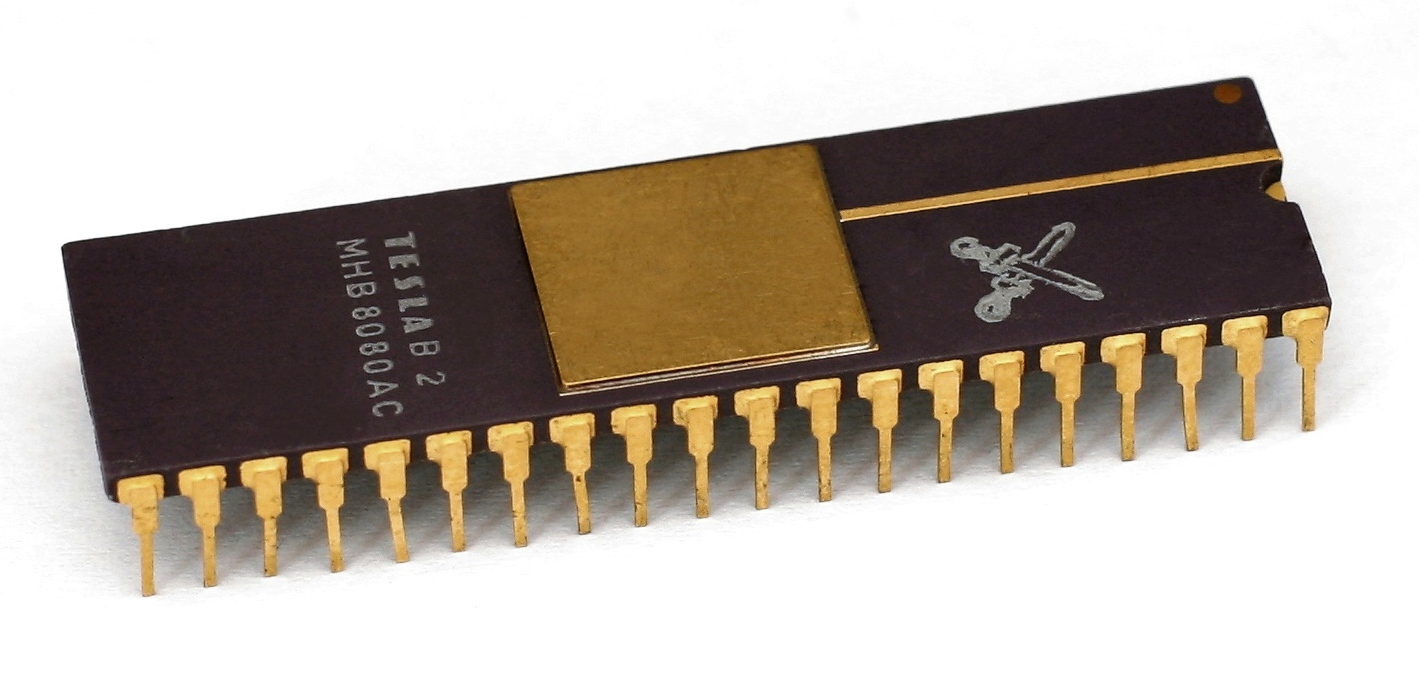
Tesla MHB8080 micoprocessor, a clone of the Intel 8080

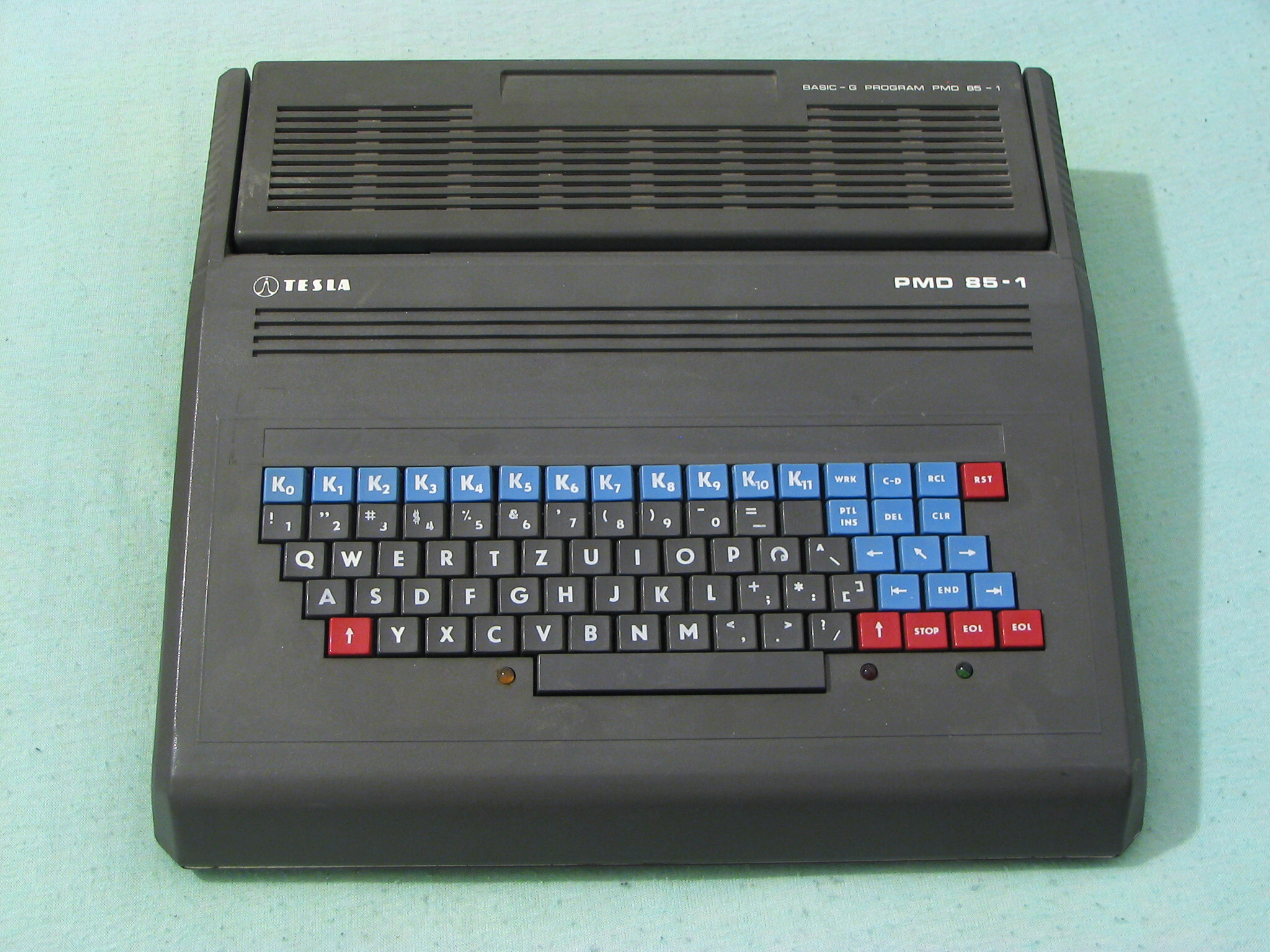
Tesla PMD 85 home computer

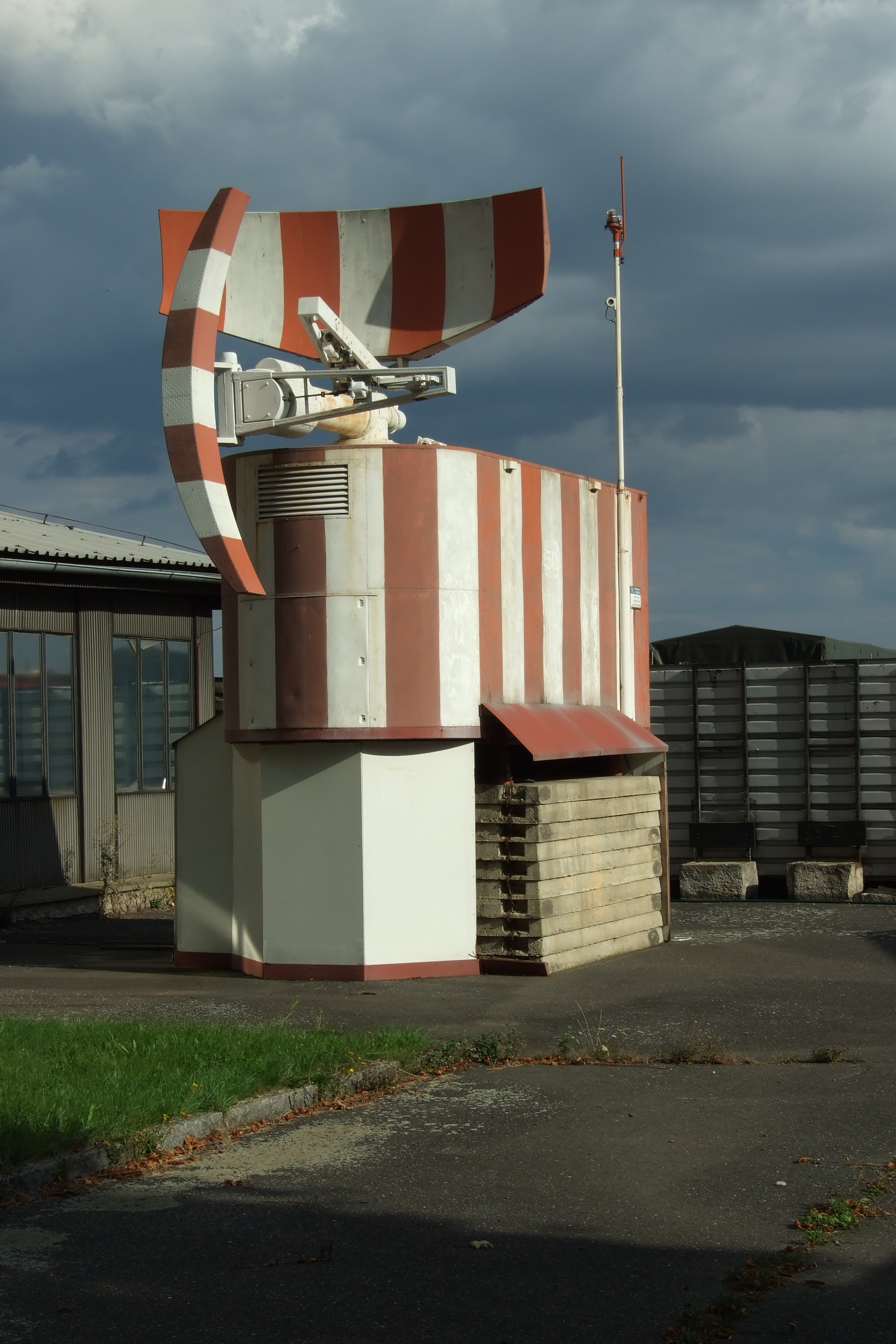
Tesla OPRL-4 air traffic control radar

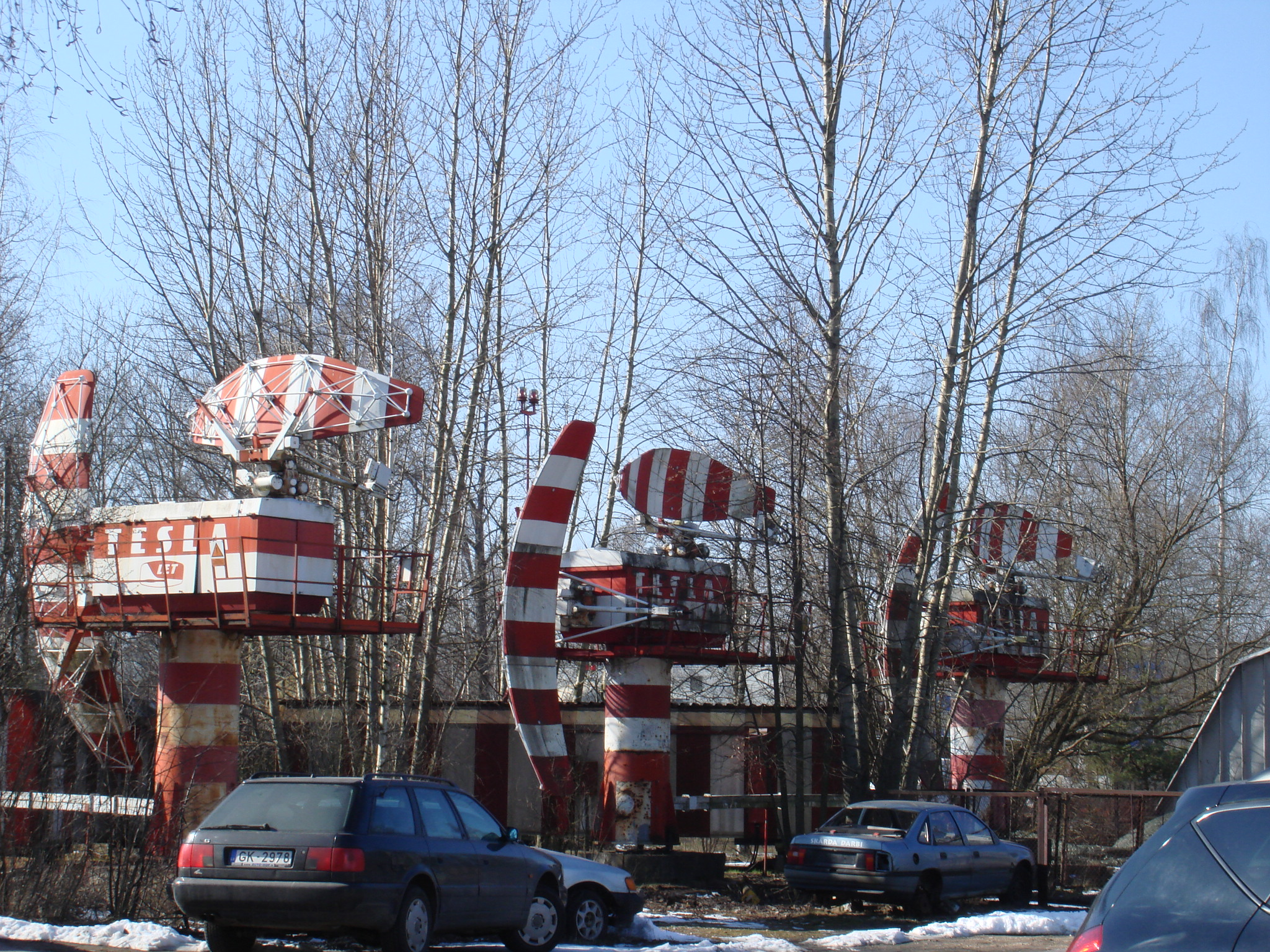
Tesla radio equipment at the Riga Civil Aviation Engineers Institute

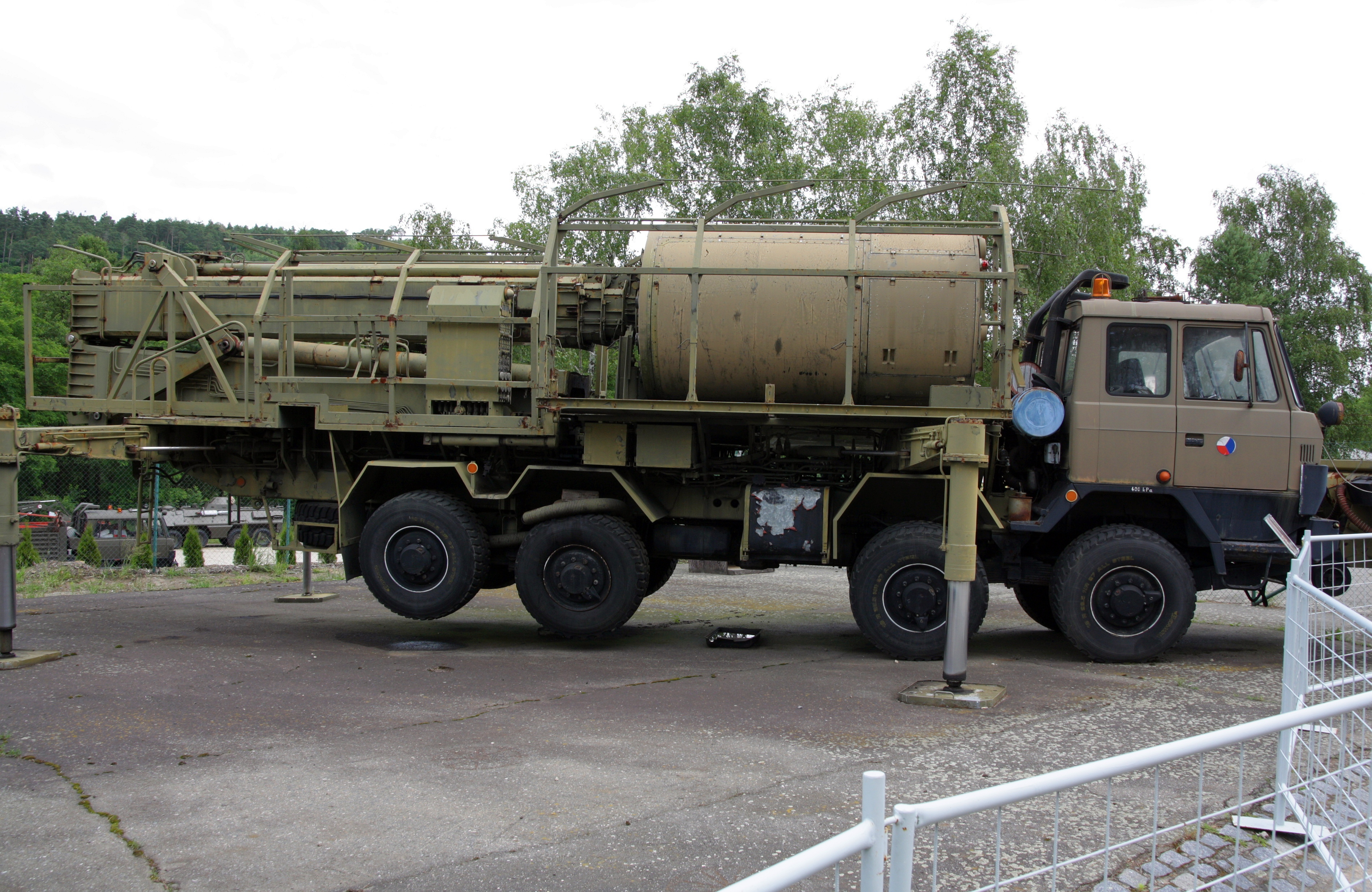
Tesla Tamara passive sensor mounted on a Tatra 815 chassis (1987–1991)
