= List of NATO reporting names for equipment =

This is a list of NATO names for Soviet, Russian and Chinese radars and ELINT systems. For additional reporting names, see NATO reporting names.

== NATO reporting names ==
=== B ===
- Ball End – common navigational radar.
- Band Stand – Missile tracking and control
- Bar Lock A – Russian P-37 "Metch" (1RL139) 2D air surveillance radar. The basic "Bar Lock" dates back to 1961.
- Bass Tilt – MR-123, fire control radar of the AK-630 close-in weapon system
- Bell Clout – Electronic warfare jamming radar
- Bell Shroud – Electronic warfare jamming radar
- Bell Squat – Electronic warfare jamming radar
- Big Bird C – SA-20 (S-300PMU-1/2) regiment surveillance radar 64N6, 1996
- Big Bird D – SA-21 (S-400 missile system) regiment surveillance radar 91N6, 2017
- Big Net – Long-range air search radar

=== C ===
- Cage Bare – VHF antenna
- Cage Cone – VHF antenna
- Cage Pot – Electronic warfare jamming radar
- Cage Stalk – VHF antenna
- Clam Shell – 76N6 low-altitude surveillance radar for S-300P
- Cross Bird – Gius-2 long range air search radar. A copy of British Type 291 radar.
- Cross Dome – MR-352 Pozitiv, a target designation radar
- Cross Slot – Soviet HF Coastal

=== D ===
- Don – Navigational radar.
- Don-Kay – Navigational radar for large ships. Replaced by Palm Frond.
- Down Beat – Maritime bomber I-band targeting radar for anti-ship cruise missiles.
- Drum Tilt – MR-104 Rys, a gun fire-control radar

=== E ===
- Egg Cup – Fire control radar for guns
- Eye Bowl – Missile tracking and control

=== F ===
- Fan Song – fire control radar of the SA-2 system
- Flat Face – target acquisition radar of the SA-3 system
- Flat Jack – rotodome-mounted airborne search radar of the Tupolev Tu-126 Moss
- Flat Twin – ABM radar for the uncommissioned S-225 ABM system
- Fire Dome – fire control radar of the SA-11 system
- Fire Can – gun direction radar used during the Vietnam War
- Flap Lid – fire control radar of the SA-10A/B system
- Flash Dance – BRLS-8B "Zaslon" radar found on the MiG-31.
- Foxfire – The TL-25 Smerch-A (also referred to as Product 720) radar featured in the MiG-25
- Front Dome – MR-90 Orekh, fire control radar of SA-N-7 system

=== G ===
- Grave Stone – fire control radar of the SA-21 system
- Grill Pan – fire control radar of the SA-12 system

=== H ===
- Hair Net – Long-range air search radar
- Half Bow – Fire control radar for guns
- Half Plate – MR-755 Fregat, target designation radar of SA-N-7 system
- Hawk Screech – MR-105 Turel, a gun fire-control radar
- Head Lights – Missile tracking and control
- Head Net-A – Long-range air search radar
- Head Net-B – Long-range air search radar
- Head Net-C – Long-range air search radar
- High Pole A – Identification friend or foe antenna
- High Pole B – Identification friend or foe antenna
- High Sieve – Long-range air search radar

=== K ===
- Kite Screech – MR-184, fire control radar of the AK-100 naval gun system
- Knife Rest – Long-range air search radar

=== L ===
- Land Roll – fire control radar of the SA-8 system
- Low Blow – fire control radar of the SA-3 system

=== M ===
- Moon Coast – Soviet Coastal
- Muff Cob – Fire control radar for guns

=== O ===
- Owl Screech – Fire control radar for guns

=== P ===
- Palm Frond – MR-212/201, a surface search radar
- Pat Hand – fire control radar of the SA-4 system
- Peel Group – Missile tracking and control
- Plank Shave – Long-range air search radar
- Plinth Net – Missile tracking and control
- Pop Group – fire-control radar of SA-N-4 system
- Pork Trough – mortar-projectile tracking radar
- Post Lamp – Fire control radar for guns
- Pot Drum – surface search radar
- Pot Hand – surface search radar
- Punch Bowl – Korvet-5 satellite data link used on Soviet surface ships and submarines.

=== R ===
- Round House – Radar array
- Rum Tub – Electronic warfare jamming radar

=== S ===
- Salt Pot A – Identification friend or foe antenna
- Scoop Pair – Missile tracking and control
- Scrum Half – fire control radar of the SA-15 system
- Side Globe – Electronic warfare jamming radar
- Side Net – height finder radar of the SA-3 system
- Skip Spin – The Oryol ('eagle') radar set featured perhaps most memorably on the Yak-28, but also on the Su-11, and Su-15.
- Slim Net – Long-range air search radar
- Slot Back – The N001 and N019 pulse-Doppler target acquisition radars used on the Su-27 and MiG-29 respectively
- Small Fred – counter-battery/surveillance radar, mounted onto a PRP-3 Val
- Small Yarn – mortar-projectile tracking radar mounted in a shelter on an AT-L self-propelled, fully tracked chassis.
- Snoop Pair – surface search radar for submarines
- Snoop Plate – surface search radar for submarines
- Snoop Slab – surface search radar for submarines
- Snoop Tray – surface search radar for submarines
- Soft Ball – Ramona ELINT system
- Spin Scan – The RP-21 Sapfir (sapphire) radar set featured in the MiG-21
- Spin Trough – Navigational radar
- Square Head – Identification friend or foe antenna
- Square Pair – fire control radar of the SA-5 system
- Square Tie – surface search radar for small combatants and cruise missile target designation. Chinese type 352.
- Squat Eye – alternate target acquisition radar of the SA-3 system
- Steel Yard – The Duga over-the-horizon radar
- Straight Flush – fire control radar of the SA-6 system
- Strut Curve – MR-302, a surface and air-search radar
- Strut Pair – Long-range air search radar
- Sun Visor – Fire control radar for guns

=== T ===
- Tin Shield B – 5N59S/36D6, air search radar of SA-10b
- Tomb Stone – fire control radar of the SA-20A/B system
- Top Bow – Fire control radar for guns
- Top Dome – Missile tracking and control
- Top Hat A – Electronic warfare jamming radar
- Top Hat B – Electronic warfare jamming radar
- Top Knot – Radar array
- Top Mesh – Long-range air search radar
- Top Pair – Long-range air search radar
- Top Plate – MR-710 Fregat, a target designation radar (Note: MR-760 Fregat has also been referred to as Top Plate.)
- Top Plate-B – MR-760 Fregat, an air search radar
- Top Sail – Long-range air search radar
- Top Steer – Long-range air search radar
- Top Trough – Long-range air search radar
- Trap Door – Missile tracking and control
- Trash Can – Tamara ELINT system

=== V ===
- Vee Bars – HF communication antenna
- Vee Cone – HF communication antenna
- Vee Tube – HF communication antenna

=== W ===
- Wall Eye – Chinese JY-8 and JY-8A
- Watch Dog – Electronic warfare jamming radar
- Watchman (T) – Soviet, in Chinese service since 1990
- Wide Mat – Chinese JY-27
