= List of Czechoslovakia interwar period weapons =

This is a list of weapons used by Czechoslovakia during its interwar period (1918–1938). These include weapons that were designed and manufactured in Czechoslovakia and Czechoslovak modifications to existing weapons, like the Schwarzlose machine gun. After the dissolution of the Second Czechoslovak Republic, many of these weapons saw combat in World War II: with the Axis Slovak Republic and with Nazi Germany after it occupied Czechoslovakia. These weapons also saw widespread use abroad after being sold off to international buyers.

== Small arms ==
=== Pistols ===
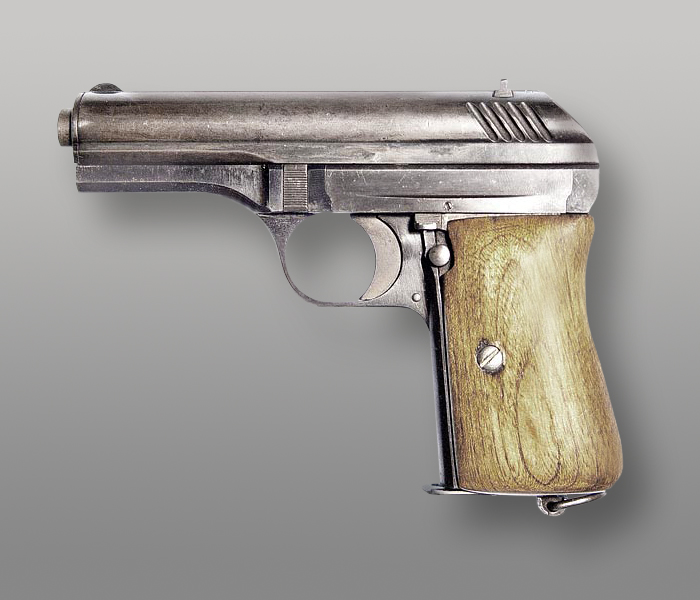
- ČZ 24 as it is known commercially. It is designated by Czechoslovak military as Vz 24. Standard Czechoslovak interwar pistol
  Pistole vz. 22
- Pistole vz. 24
- ČZ vz. 27
- ČZ vz. 38

=== Rifles ===
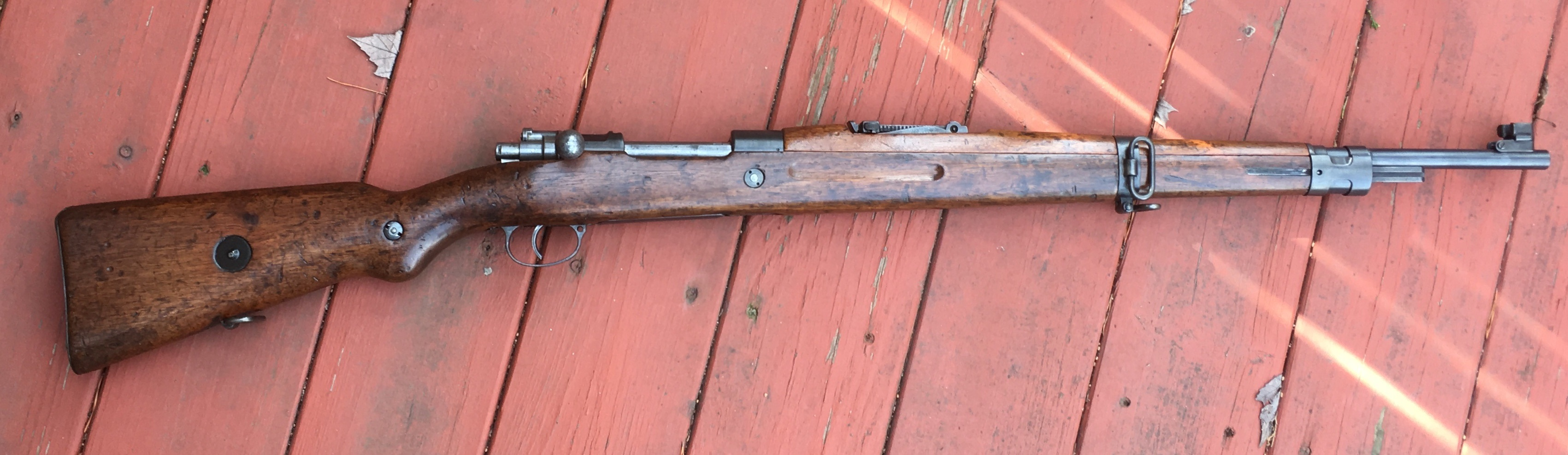
- Gewehr 98 inspired Czechoslovak Vz 24 rifle. Standard Czechoslovak army rifle for most of the interwar period
  Vz. 98/22
- Vz. 24
- Vz. 33
- Vz. 39
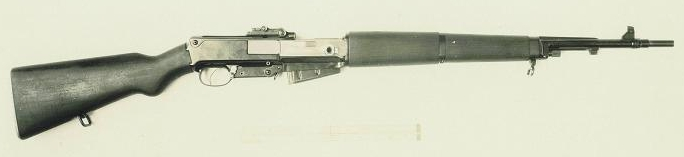
- Czechoslovak ZH-29 one of the first semi-auto rifles in the world.
  ZH-29

=== Submachine guns ===
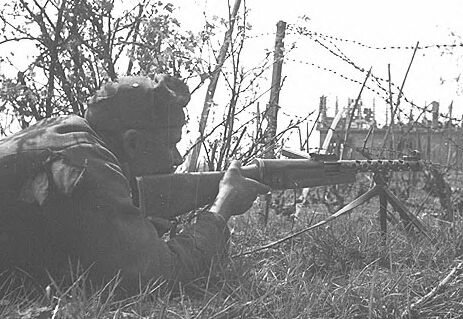
- Bulgarian soldier using Czechoslovak ZK-383 submachine gun with bipod deployed. Started production in 1938 just before occupation. Bipod added as was intended to be used as a squad automatic weapon like a Bren gun or DP28
  ZK-383
- KP vz. 38

=== Machine guns ===
- ZB vz. 26 (main inspiration for Bren gun alongside the updated ZB vz 30)
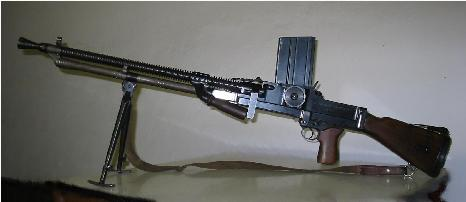
- ZB vz. 26 Czechoslovak light machine gun, which saw extensive use in World War II by several countries.
  ZB vz. 30
- Schwarzlose machine gun (Schwarzlose-Janeček vz.07/24 variant)
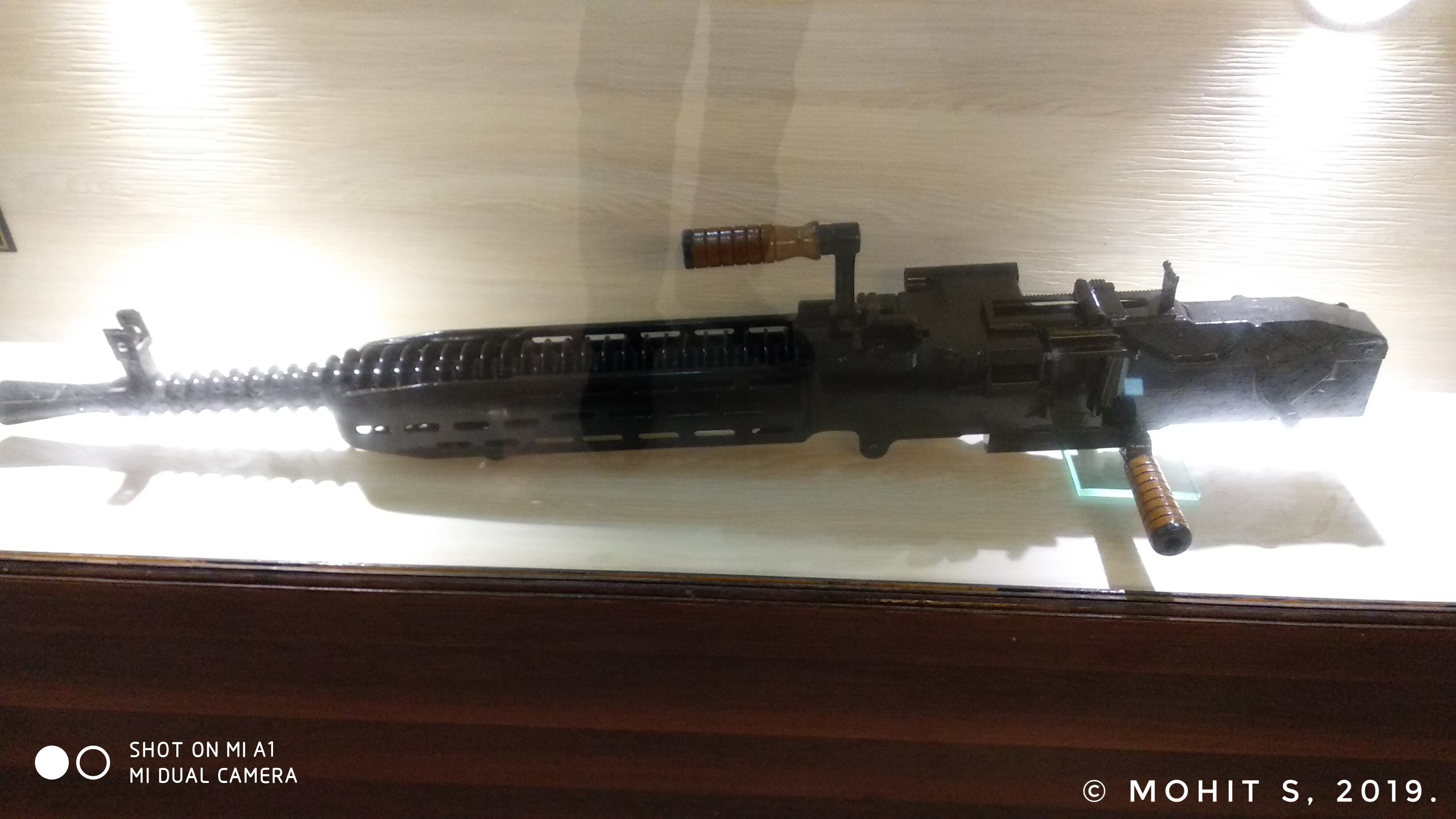
- ZB-53(Czechoslovak army designation TK vz 37) Czechoslovak medium machine gun. Was invented in 1935 and produced in late 1930's.Before this Czechoslovakia used modified forms of the Schwarzlose machine gun as medium machine guns.
  ZB-53 (main inspiration for Besa gun)
- ZB-50
- ZB-60 (main inspiration for Besa 15 mm heavy machine gun)

=== Mortars ===
- 8 cm minomet vz. 36

=== Grenades ===
- Offensive/Defensive impact grenade Vz 21
- OUG vz 34 impact grenade
- ORG vz 38 impact grenade
- OČRG vz 38 time fuze grenade

== Artillery ==
=== Tank and Anti-tank guns ===
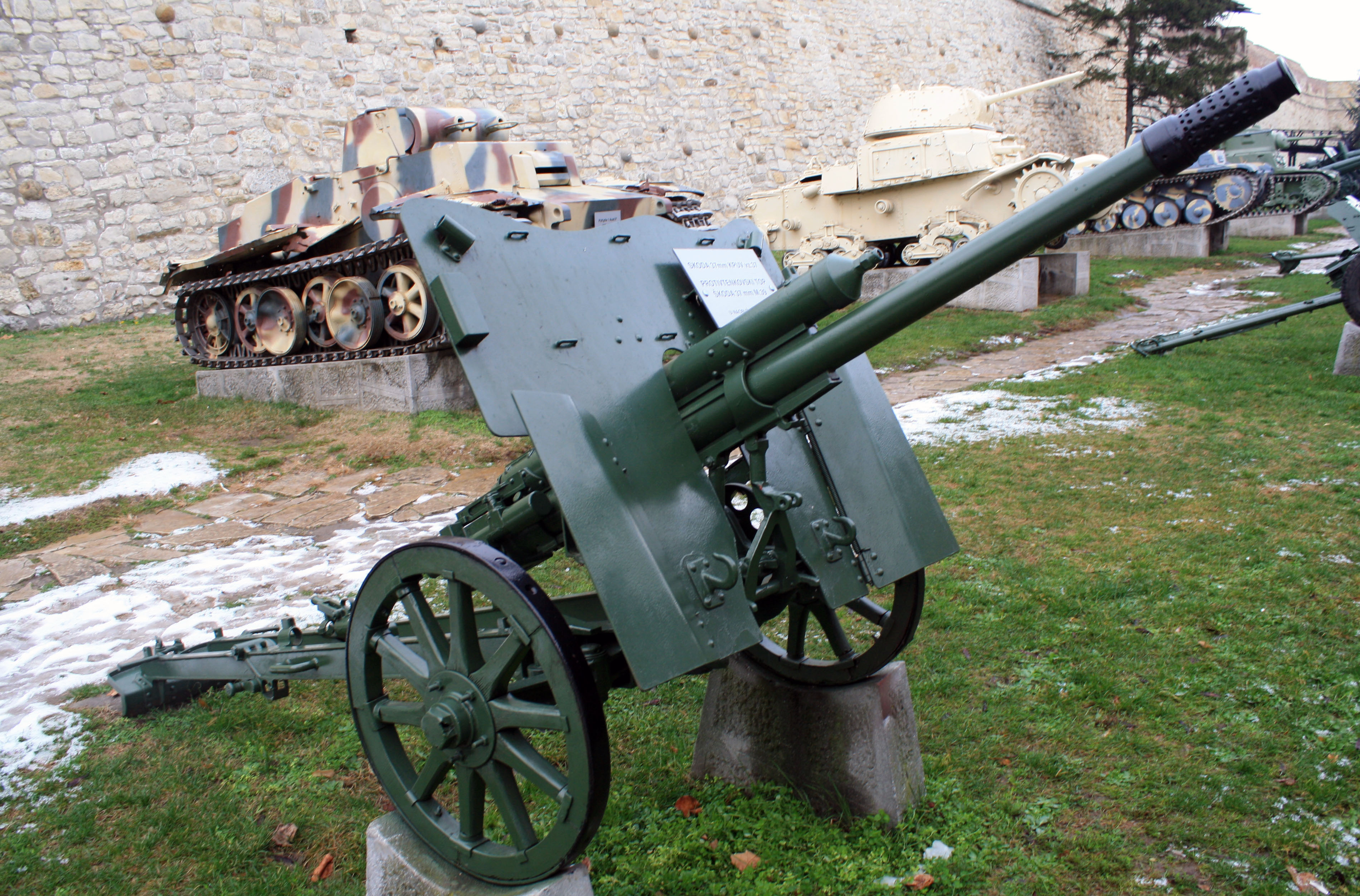
- Skoda 3,7 cm KPÚV vz 37 interwar Czechoslovak anti-tank gun
  3,7cm KPÚV vz. 34 (main armament of Czechoslovak tank LT vz 34 and LT vz 35 the latter AKA Panzer 35(t))
- 4cm kanón vz. 36
- 3,7cm KPÚV vz. 37
- 3,7cm ÚV vz. 38 (main armament of Czechoslovak LT vz 38 tank AKA Panzer 38(t))
- 4,7cm KPÚV vz. 38 (gun of Panzerjager I)

=== Field guns and Mountain guns ===
- Skoda 75 mm Model 1928
- Skoda 75 mm Model 1936
- Skoda 75 mm Model 1939
- 8 cm kanon vz. 28
- 8 cm kanon vz. 30
- Skoda houfnice vz 14
- Skoda 100 mm Model 16/19
- 10 cm houfnice vz. 28
- 10 cm houfnice vz. 30 (howitzer)
- 10.5 cm hruby kanon vz. 35
- Skoda 105 mm Model 1939

=== Heavy artillery ===
- 15 cm hrubá houfnice vz. 25
- Skoda K series
- Skoda Model 1928 Gun
- 21 cm Mörser M. 16/18
- 21 cm Kanone 39
- 210 mm gun M1939 (Br-17)
- Skoda 220 mm howitzer
- 24 cm Haubitze 39
- 305 mm howitzer M1939 (Br-18)

=== Anti-Aircraft artillery ===
- 2cm VKPL vz 36(Oerlikon 20 mm cannon)
- 7.5 cm kanon PL vz. 37
- 8 cm PL kanon vz. 37
- 8.35 cm PL kanon vz. 22
- 9 cm kanon PL vz. 12/20

=== Naval artillery ===
- Skoda 14 cm/56 naval gun
- Škoda 6.6 cm (2.6 inch) naval gun on the river monitor President Masaryk

== Armoured fighting vehicles ==
=== Tanks ===
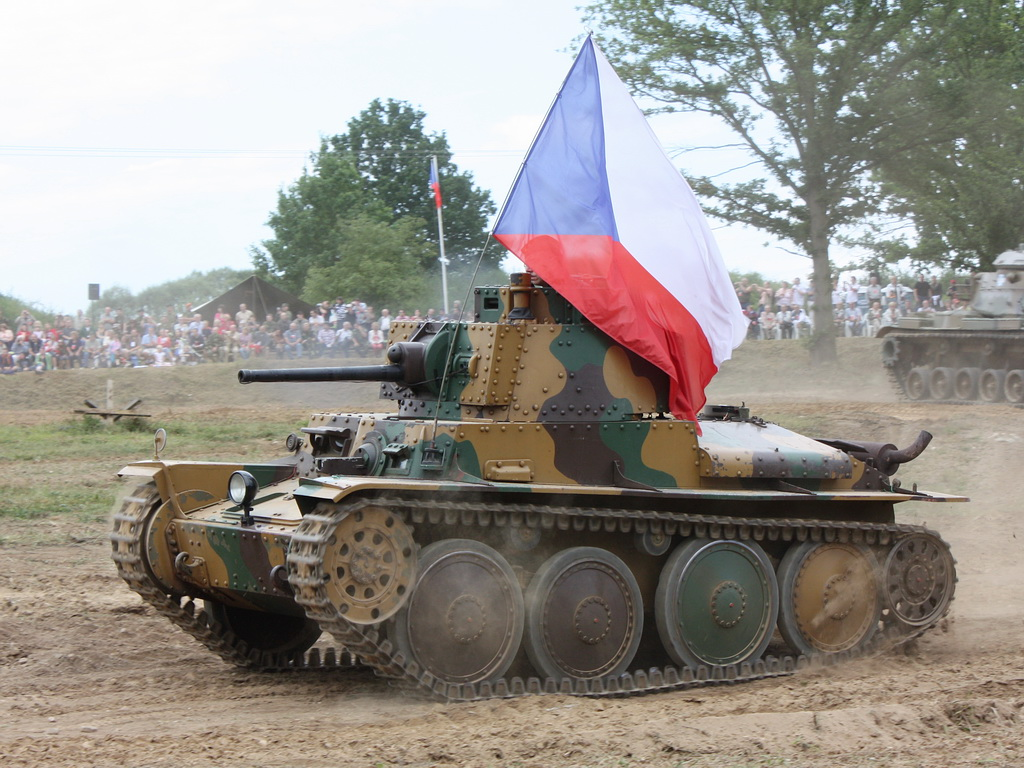
- LT vz 38 Czechoslovak light tank. German designation Panzer38(t),. Most famous Czechoslovak interwar weapon after being popularised by use by Nazi Germany in early World War II (Polish campaign to start of operation Barbarossa). This tank also saw use in other countries as well as the previous LT vz 35 light tank.
  Kolohousenka
- LT vz. 34
- LT vz 35 (Panzer 35(t))
- LT vz 38(Panzer 38(t))
- ST vz 39 (commercial designation V-8-H)

=== Tankettes ===
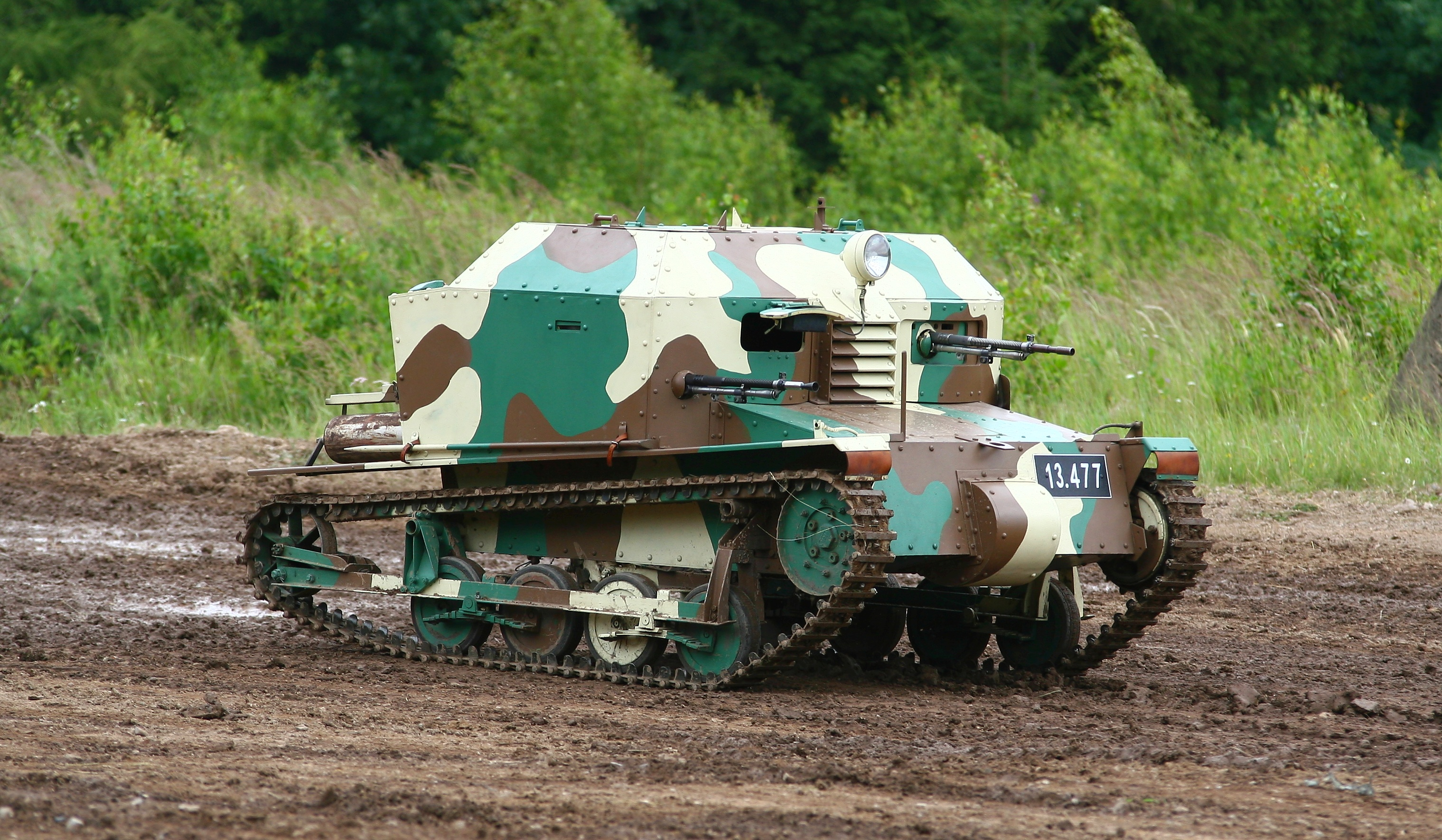
- Tančík vz 33 Tankette in service with Czechoslovak military in inter-war period.
  Tančík vz. 33
- Škoda MU-4
- AH-IV

=== Armoured cars ===
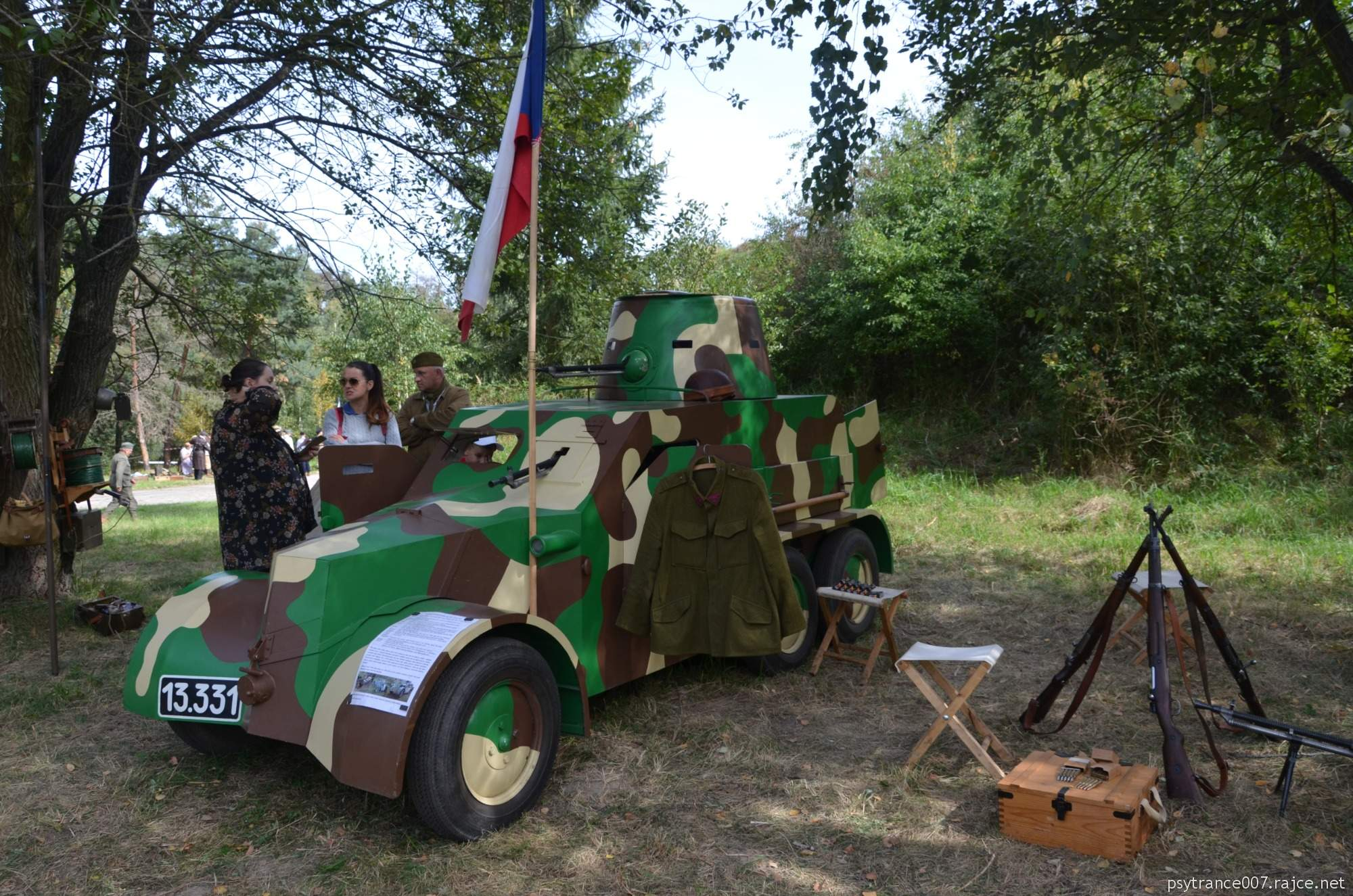
- Replica OA vz 30 in Czechoslovak vehicle camouflage is which can be seen in previous Czechoslovak AFV images. Armoured car of Czechoslovak armed forces in inter-war period.
  OA vz. 27
- OA vz. 30
- OA vz 23
- Škoda Fiat Torino

== See also ==
- Battle of Czajánek's barracks
