= History of Czechoslovakia (1918–1938) =

The First Czechoslovak Republic emerged from the collapse of the Austro-Hungarian Empire in October 1918. The new state consisted mostly of territories inhabited by Czechs and Slovaks, but also included areas containing majority populations of other nationalities, particularly Germans (22.95 %), who accounted for more citizens than the state's second state nation of the Slovaks, Hungarians (5.47 %) and Ruthenians (3.39 %). The new state comprised the total of Bohemia whose borders did not coincide with the language border between German and Czech. Despite initially developing effective representative institutions alongside a successful economy, the deteriorating international economic situation in the 1930s gave rise to growing ethnic tensions. The dispute between the Czech and German populations, fanned by the rise of Nazism in neighbouring Germany, resulted in the loss of territory under the terms of the Munich Agreement and subsequent events in the autumn of 1938, bringing about the end of the First Republic.

== Independence ==
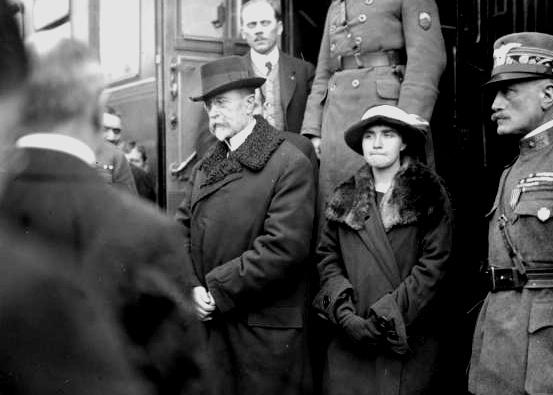
Masaryk returning from exile

Following the Pittsburgh Agreement of May 1918, the Czechoslovak declaration of independence, created in Washington, was published by the Czechoslovak National Council, signed by Masaryk, Štefánik and Beneš on 18 October 1918 in Paris, and proclaimed on 28th October in Prague.

Initial authority within Czechoslovakia was assumed by the newly created National Assembly on 14 November 1918. Because territorial demarcations were uncertain and elections impossible, the provisional National Assembly was constituted on the basis of the 1911 elections to the Austrian parliament with the addition of 54 representatives from Slovakia. National minorities were not represented. Hungarians remained loyal to Hungary.

On 12 November 1918, a Republic of German Austria was declared, with the intent of unifying with Germany, relying on President Wilson's principle of self-determination. The state claimed all the German-speaking areas of the former Cisleithania, including those in Czechoslovakia.

The National Assembly of Czechoslovakia elected Tomáš Garrigue Masaryk as its first president, chose a provisional government headed by Karel Kramář, and drafted a provisional constitution.

The Paris Peace Conference convened in January 1919. The Czech delegation was led by Kramář and Beneš, premier and foreign minister respectively, of the Czechoslovak provisional government. The conference approved the establishment of the Czechoslovak Republic, to encompass the historic Bohemian Kingdom, Moravia and Silesia, as well as Slovakia and Carpathian Ruthenia. The inclusion of Ruthenia provided a common frontier with Romania, an important ally against Hungary. To address concerns of the British delegation that the incorporation of exclusively German-settled areas violates the principle of self-determination, the Czech delegation had presented to the conference a memorandum containing misrepresentations of the German-settled area. In particular, the number of Czechs in the German-settled areas was overblown by a factor of ten and lands of German majority between Komotau and Teplitz was shown as Czech-majority, while the Germans of Moravia were neglected completely. No German or Austrian delegation was present the conference.

In a subcommittee for the German-Czech border, the American delegation proposed border correction such that Eger, Rumburg, Friedland, and Freiwaldau were to become part of Germany because of their half a million German-speaking inhabitants. Also the British David Lloyd George initially called for a rectification of the German-Bohemian border, but surrendered to Clemenceau's intention to keep down the Germans. The border was hence set without holding referendums, even though Lloyd George himself had strongly called for referendums for determining the Polish-German border.

In March 1919 there were reports that:

- Austria and Czechoslovakia had broken off diplomatic relations.
- Czechoslovakia's government in Prague alleged a conspiracy between Austria and Saxony to invade Czechoslovakia.

The dispute was over possession of the German-speaking parts of Bohemia and Moravia (later known as the Sudetenland); their German-speaking inhabitants had declared themselves to be part of Austria, and if that was prevented, demanded to be annexed by Saxony and the German Republics. Czechoslovakia wanted to hold onto this area because of its many valuable mines. Czechoslovakia sent Czech troops into the German area to stop disorders, and the Vienna press printed reports of Czech troops firing on and killing Germans in that area, including 15–20 in Kaaden, three in Eger, and two in Karlsbad. During this, on about 1 March, Josef Mayer, Austria's Minister of War (a native of Eger), went to go to Eger and was arrested at Gratzen after crossing the border, but was allowed to continue to Eger; two days later he went into Germany via Schärding, and by railway via Regensburg and Passau back to Vienna.

In January 1920 the Czechoslovak army, breaking prior agreements with Poland, crossed the demarcation line and by force of arms occupied the Trans-Olza region, where a 60% majority of the population was Polish, compared to 25% Czechs. After brief fights they made a truce on the power of which Czechoslovakia occupied areas to the west of Olza River. The Czech claim to Lusatia, which had been part of the Bohemian Kingdom until the Thirty Years' War, was rejected.

On 10 September 1919, Czechoslovakia signed the Minorities Treaty, placing its ethnic minorities under the protection of the League of Nations.

== Statehood ==
The establishment of the Constitution of 1920 installed a parliamentary system and representative democracy with relatively few constituents for each representative. This allowed a great variety of political parties to emerge, with no clear front runner or leading political entity.

Tomáš Garrigue Masaryk was elected the country's first president in the 1920 election and his guidance helped to hold the country together. A coalition of five Czechoslovak parties, which became known as the "Pětka" (The Five), constituted the backbone of the government and maintained stability. Prime Minister Antonín Švehla led the Pětka for most of the 1920s and designed a pattern of coalition politics that survived until 1938. Masaryk was re-elected in 1925 and 1929, serving as President until 14 December 1935 when he resigned due to poor health. He was succeeded by Edvard Beneš.

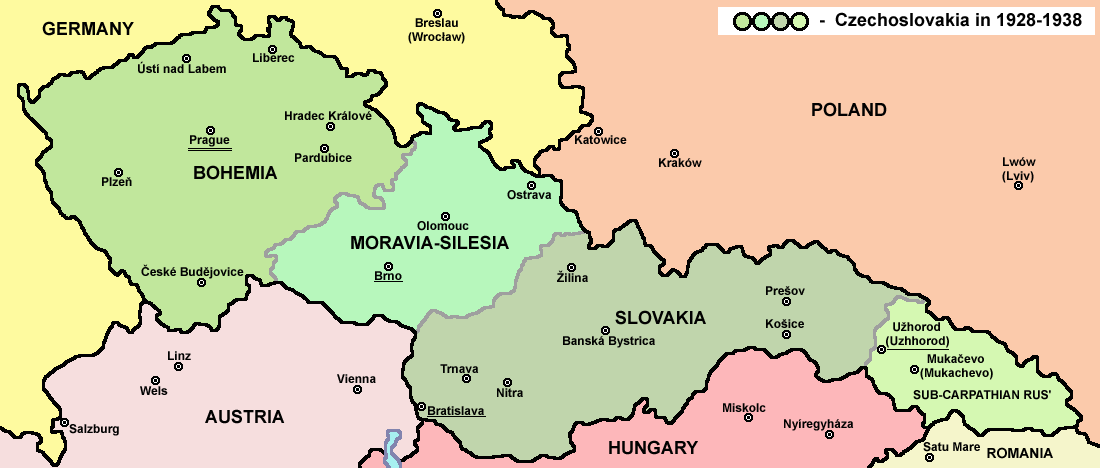
Czechoslovakia in 1928

Beneš had served as Czechoslovak foreign minister from 1918 to 1935, and created the system of alliances that determined the republic's international stance until 1938. A democratic statesman of Western orientation, Beneš relied heavily on the League of Nations as guarantor of the post war status quo and the security of newly formed states. He negotiated the Little Entente (an alliance with Yugoslavia and Romania) in 1921 to counter Hungarian revanchism and Habsburg restoration.

The leaders of Czechoslovakia needed to find solutions for the multiplicity of cultures living within one country. From 1928 and 1940, Czechoslovakia was divided into the four "lands" (Czech: země, Slovak: krajiny); Bohemia, Moravia-Silesia, Slovakia and Carpathian Ruthenia. Although in 1927 assemblies were provided for Bohemia, Slovakia, and Ruthenia, their jurisdiction was limited to adjusting laws and regulations of the central government to local needs. National minorities were assured special protection; in districts where they constituted 20% of the population, members of minority groups were granted full freedom to use their language in everyday life, in schools, and in matters dealing with authorities. German parties also participated in the government starting in 1926, while Hungarian parties, supporting Hungarian irredentist claims, never joined the Czechoslovak government but were not openly hostile to it.

== Growing conflict ==
Due to Czechoslovakia's centralized political structure, nationalism arose in the non-Czech nationalities, and several parties and movements were formed with the aim of broader political autonomy. The Slovak People's Party led by Andrej Hlinka is an example.

When German dictator Adolf Hitler came to power in 1933, fear of German aggression became widespread in eastern Central Europe. Beneš ignored the possibility of a stronger Central European alliance system, remaining faithful to his Western policy. He did, however, seek the participation of the Soviet Union in an alliance to include France. (Beneš's earlier attitude towards the Soviet regime had been one of caution.) In 1935 the Soviet Union signed treaties with France and Czechoslovakia. In essence, the treaties provided that the Soviet Union would come to Czechoslovakia's aid, but only if French assistance came first. Hitler himself remarked to his foreign minister von Neurath and top military officials in 1937 that he intended to absorb Bohemia and Austria, with a vague sentence about the need to expel two million Czechs and the eventual elimination of the Czech nation.

There was a large German minority in Czechoslovakia, mostly living in Sudetenland.

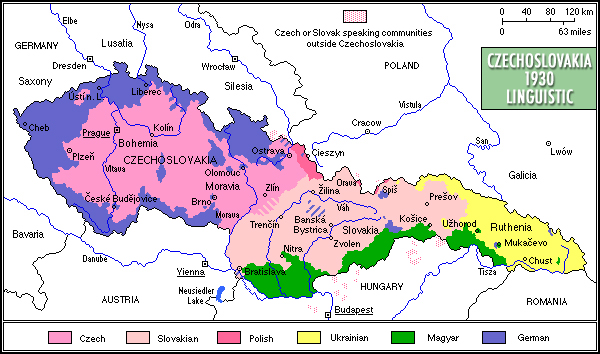
Linguistic map of interwar Czechoslovakia (c. 1930)

They demanded autonomy within Czechoslovakia, claiming they were oppressed by the national government. The political vehicle for this agitation was the newly founded Sudeten German Party (Sudetendeutsche Partei – SdP) led by Konrad Henlein, and financed with Nazi money. In the 1935 Parliamentary elections, the SdP had a surprise success, securing over 2/3 of the Sudeten German vote. This worsened diplomatic relations between Germany and Czechoslovakia. Hitler met with Henlein in Berlin on 28 March 1938, and ordered him to raise demands unacceptable to the Czechoslovak government. On 24 April, the SdP issued the Carlsbad Programme, demanding autonomy for the Sudetenland and the freedom to profess Nazi ideology. If these demands were granted, the Sudetenland could then align with Nazi Germany.

On 17 September 1938 Adolf Hitler ordered the establishment of Sudetendeutsches Freikorps, a paramilitary organization that took over the structure of Ordnersgruppe, an organization of ethnic-Germans in Czechoslovakia that had been dissolved by the Czechoslovak authorities the previous day due to its implication in large number of terrorist activities. The organization was sheltered, trained and equipped by German authorities and conducting cross border terrorist operations into Czechoslovak territory. Relying on the Convention for the Definition of Aggression, Czechoslovak president Edvard Beneš and the government-in-exile later regarded 17 September 1938 as the beginning of the undeclared German-Czechoslovak war. This understanding has been assumed also by the contemporary Czech Constitutional court.

== See also ==
- Germans in Czechoslovakia (1918–1938)
- Polish minority in the Czech Republic
- Rusyns and Ukrainians in Czechoslovakia (1918–1938)
- Slovak People's Party
- Hungarians in Czechoslovakia (Slovakia)

== Bibliography ==
- Agnew, Hugh Lecaine. The Czechs and the Lands of the Bohemian Crown (Stanford, CA, Hoover Institution Press: Stanford University, 2004).
- Axworthy, Mark W.A. Axis Slovakia—Hitler's Slavic Wedge, 1938–1945, Bayside, N.Y. : Axis Europa Books, 2002, ISBN 1-891227-41-6
- Evans, Robert John Weston; Cornwall, Mark: Czechoslovakia in a nationalist and fascist Europe : 1918–1948. Oxford University Press, 2007, ISBN 978-0-19-726391-4.
- Mueggenberg, Brent, The Czecho-Slovak Struggle for Independence, 1914–1920, Jefferson, NC: McFarland & Company, 2014
- Zimmern, Alfred. "Czechoslovakia To-Day," International Affairs (July–August, 1938), 17#4 pp. 465–492 in JSTOR, just before Munich

=== Other languages ===
- Bosl, Karl: Handbuch der Geschichte der böhmischen Länder (4 Bände). Anton Hiersemann Verlag Stuttgart, 1970
- Franzel, Emil: Sudetendeutsche Geschichte. Adam Kraft Verlag Augsburg, 1958.
- Frei, Bohumil: Tschechoslowakei. G.Alzog Verlag München, 1968.
- Meixner, Rudolf: Geschichte der Sudetendeutschen. Helmut Preußler Verlag Nürnberg, 1988.
- Zemko, Milan (ed.): Slovensko v Ceskoslovensku (1918–1939). Bratislava : VEDA, Vydavatel´stvo Slovenskej Akad. Vied, 2004. ISBN 80-224-0795-X.
- Angyal, Béla (ed.): Dokumentumok az Országos Keresztényszocialista Párt történetéhez : 1919 – 1936. Dunaszerdahely [u.a.] : Lilium Aurum [u.a.], 2004, ISBN 80-8062-195-0.
- Eva Broklová: Ceskoslovenská demokracie: politický systém CSR 1918 – 1938. Prague: Sociologické Nakladatelství, 1992. ISBN 80-901059-6-3.
