= Elections in the First Czechoslovak Republic =

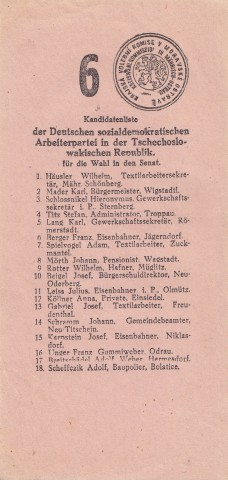
List of DSAP candidates for the Senate in the VII. Moravská Ostrava electoral district, stamped by the District Election Commission

Parliamentary elections in the First Czechoslovak Republic were held in 1920, 1925, 1929 and 1935. The Czechoslovak National Assembly consisted of two chambers, the Chamber of Deputies and the Senate, both elected through universal suffrage. During the First Republic, many political parties struggled for political influence and only once did a single party muster a quarter of the national vote. Parties were generally set up along ethnic lines.

== Electoral system ==
The electoral system of the First Republic was based on the Czechoslovak Constitution of 1920. Parliamentary elections were regulated by Acts 123 and 208 of 1920.

The Czechoslovak parliament at the time consisted of a Chamber of Deputies (300 members) and a Senate (150 members). Parliamentarians were elected under a proportional representation system using multi-member electoral districts. The Hare quota was used in the first count, and the Hagenbach-Bischoff quota in the second count. The President of the Republic was elected by both houses of parliament.

Suffrage was universal, secret and compulsory for all citizens aged 21 years and above for elections to the Chamber of Deputies and aged 26 years and above for the Senate. Voters were required to have lived in their respective constituency for three months to be entitled to vote there. Bankrupt citizens and citizens convicted of crimes could lose their right to vote.

Candidates to the Chamber of Deputies had to be 30 years of age and Czechoslovak citizens for at least three years. Candidates to the Senate had to be 45 years of age and Czechoslovak citizens for at least ten years.

The Ministry of the Interior was charged with organizing the elections.

== Electoral districts ==
Initially, the republic had 23 electoral districts for elections to the Chamber of Deputies and 13 electoral districts for the Senate. Below is a table where the Chamber of Deputies electoral districts are organized by Senate electoral district, with 1921 and 1930 census data for reference. Constituency and seat numbers in parentheses refer to the situation before the 1925 re-districting.

Province	Electoral district (Chamber of Deputies)		Seats	Pop. (1921)	Pop./Seat (1921)	Pop. (1930)	Pop./Seat (1930)	Electoral district (Senate)		Seats	Pop. (1921)	Pop./Seat (1921)	Pop. (1930)	Pop./Seat (1930)
Bohemia Districts: 9 Population: 1921: 6,664,932; 1930: 7,014,559 Seats; Chamber of Dep.: (157)/160; Senate: (78)/79 Inhabitants per seat Chamber of Dep.: 1921: 42,452; 1930: 43,841; Senate: 1921: 85,448; 1930: 88,792	IA.	Prague A	(45); 24 +24	1,741,455	38,699	931,889	38,829	I.	Prague	(23); 24	1,741,455	75,715	1,942,914	80,955
Bohemia Districts: 9 Population: 1921: 6,664,932; 1930: 7,014,559 Seats; Chamber of Dep.: (157)/160; Senate: (78)/79 Inhabitants per seat Chamber of Dep.: 1921: 42,452; 1930: 43,841; Senate: 1921: 85,448; 1930: 88,792	IB.	Prague B	(45); 24 +24	1,741,455	38,699	1,011,025	42,126	I.	Prague	(23); 24	1,741,455	75,715	1,942,914	80,955
Bohemia Districts: 9 Population: 1921: 6,664,932; 1930: 7,014,559 Seats; Chamber of Dep.: (157)/160; Senate: (78)/79 Inhabitants per seat Chamber of Dep.: 1921: 42,452; 1930: 43,841; Senate: 1921: 85,448; 1930: 88,792	II.	Pardubice	11	477,384	43,399	488,959	44,451	II.	Hradec Králové	11	983,719	89,429	1,007,491	91,590
Bohemia Districts: 9 Population: 1921: 6,664,932; 1930: 7,014,559 Seats; Chamber of Dep.: (157)/160; Senate: (78)/79 Inhabitants per seat Chamber of Dep.: 1921: 42,452; 1930: 43,841; Senate: 1921: 85,448; 1930: 88,792	III.	Hradec Králové	12	506,335	42,195	518,532	43,211	II.	Hradec Králové	11	983,719	89,429	1,007,491	91,590
Bohemia Districts: 9 Population: 1921: 6,664,932; 1930: 7,014,559 Seats; Chamber of Dep.: (157)/160; Senate: (78)/79 Inhabitants per seat Chamber of Dep.: 1921: 42,452; 1930: 43,841; Senate: 1921: 85,448; 1930: 88,792	IV.	Ml. Boleslav	17	734,847	43,226	766,210	45,071	III.	Ml. Boleslav	15	1,299,296	86,620	1,361,467	90,764
Bohemia Districts: 9 Population: 1921: 6,664,932; 1930: 7,014,559 Seats; Chamber of Dep.: (157)/160; Senate: (78)/79 Inhabitants per seat Chamber of Dep.: 1921: 42,452; 1930: 43,841; Senate: 1921: 85,448; 1930: 88,792	V.	Česká Lípa	13	564,449	43,419	595,257	45,789	III.	Ml. Boleslav	15	1,299,296	86,620	1,361,467	90,764
Bohemia Districts: 9 Population: 1921: 6,664,932; 1930: 7,014,559 Seats; Chamber of Dep.: (157)/160; Senate: (78)/79 Inhabitants per seat Chamber of Dep.: 1921: 42,452; 1930: 43,841; Senate: 1921: 85,448; 1930: 88,792	VI.	Louny	17	785,513	46,207	824,681	48,511	IV.	Louny	14	1,321,905	94,422	1,394,854	99,632
Bohemia Districts: 9 Population: 1921: 6,664,932; 1930: 7,014,559 Seats; Chamber of Dep.: (157)/160; Senate: (78)/79 Inhabitants per seat Chamber of Dep.: 1921: 42,452; 1930: 43,841; Senate: 1921: 85,448; 1930: 88,792	VII.	Karlovy Vary	12	536,392	44,699	570,173	47,514	IV.	Louny	14	1,321,905	94,422	1,394,854	99,632
Bohemia Districts: 9 Population: 1921: 6,664,932; 1930: 7,014,559 Seats; Chamber of Dep.: (157)/160; Senate: (78)/79 Inhabitants per seat Chamber of Dep.: 1921: 42,452; 1930: 43,841; Senate: 1921: 85,448; 1930: 88,792	VIII.	Plzeň	17	756,668	44,510	760,621	44,742	V.	Plzeň	15	1,318,557	87,904	1,307,833	87,189
Bohemia Districts: 9 Population: 1921: 6,664,932; 1930: 7,014,559 Seats; Chamber of Dep.: (157)/160; Senate: (78)/79 Inhabitants per seat Chamber of Dep.: 1921: 42,452; 1930: 43,841; Senate: 1921: 85,448; 1930: 88,792	IX.	České Budějovice	13	561,889	43,222	547,212	42,093	V.	Plzeň	15	1,318,557	87,904	1,307,833	87,189
Moravia-Silesia Districts: (6)/5; Population: 1921: 3,331,674; 1930: 3,501,688 Seats; Chamber of Dep.: (73)/70; Senate: (37)/36 Inhabitants per seat Chamber of Dep.: 1921: 45,639; 1930: 50,024; Senate: 1921: 90,045; 1930: 97,269	X.	Jihlava	9	432,310	48,034	435,177	48,353	VI.	Brno	17	1,566,045	92,120	1,648,665	96,980
Moravia-Silesia Districts: (6)/5; Population: 1921: 3,331,674; 1930: 3,501,688 Seats; Chamber of Dep.: (73)/70; Senate: (37)/36 Inhabitants per seat Chamber of Dep.: 1921: 45,639; 1930: 50,024; Senate: 1921: 90,045; 1930: 97,269	XI.	Brno	(16); 17	755,151	47,197	808,015	47,530	VI.	Brno	17	1,566,045	92,120	1,648,665	96,980
Moravia-Silesia Districts: (6)/5; Population: 1921: 3,331,674; 1930: 3,501,688 Seats; Chamber of Dep.: (73)/70; Senate: (37)/36 Inhabitants per seat Chamber of Dep.: 1921: 45,639; 1930: 50,024; Senate: 1921: 90,045; 1930: 97,269	XIII.	Uherské Hradiště	8	378,584	47,323	405,473	50,684	VI.	Brno	17	1,566,045	92,120	1,648,665	96,980
Moravia-Silesia Districts: (6)/5; Population: 1921: 3,331,674; 1930: 3,501,688 Seats; Chamber of Dep.: (73)/70; Senate: (37)/36 Inhabitants per seat Chamber of Dep.: 1921: 45,639; 1930: 50,024; Senate: 1921: 90,045; 1930: 97,269	XII.	Olomouc	17	803,371	47,257	835,607	49,153	VII.	Mor. Ostrava	(16); 19	1,456,015	91,001	1,853,023	97,528
Moravia-Silesia Districts: (6)/5; Population: 1921: 3,331,674; 1930: 3,501,688 Seats; Chamber of Dep.: (73)/70; Senate: (37)/36 Inhabitants per seat Chamber of Dep.: 1921: 45,639; 1930: 50,024; Senate: 1921: 90,045; 1930: 97,269	XIV.	Mor. Ostrava	(14); 19	652,644	46,617	1,017,416	53,548	VII.	Mor. Ostrava	(16); 19	1,456,015	91,001	1,853,023	97,528
Moravia-Silesia Districts: (6)/5; Population: 1921: 3,331,674; 1930: 3,501,688 Seats; Chamber of Dep.: (73)/70; Senate: (37)/36 Inhabitants per seat Chamber of Dep.: 1921: 45,639; 1930: 50,024; Senate: 1921: 90,045; 1930: 97,269	(XXII.)	Těšín	(9)	309,614	34,402	–	–	(XII.)	Těšín	(4)	309,614	77,404	–	–
Slovakia Districts: 7 Population: 2,993,479; 1930: 3,256,468 Seats; Chamber of Dep.: 61; Senate: 31 Inhabitants per seat Chamber of Dep.: 1921: 49,073; 1930: 53,385; Senate: 1921: 96,564; 1930: 105,047	XV.	Trnava	9	433,405	48,156	477,195	53,022	VIII.	Turč. Sv. Martin	10	950,325	95,033	1,045,065	104,507
Slovakia Districts: 7 Population: 2,993,479; 1930: 3,256,468 Seats; Chamber of Dep.: 61; Senate: 31 Inhabitants per seat Chamber of Dep.: 1921: 49,073; 1930: 53,385; Senate: 1921: 96,564; 1930: 105,047	XVII.	Turč. Sv. Martin	11	516,920	46,993	567,870	51,625	VIII.	Turč. Sv. Martin	10	950,325	95,033	1,045,065	104,507
Slovakia Districts: 7 Population: 2,993,479; 1930: 3,256,468 Seats; Chamber of Dep.: 61; Senate: 31 Inhabitants per seat Chamber of Dep.: 1921: 49,073; 1930: 53,385; Senate: 1921: 96,564; 1930: 105,047	XVIII.	Báňská Bystrica	7	329,143	47,020	347,494	49,642	IX.	Lipt. Sv. Mikuláš	7	577,845	82,549	607,947	86,850
Slovakia Districts: 7 Population: 2,993,479; 1930: 3,256,468 Seats; Chamber of Dep.: 61; Senate: 31 Inhabitants per seat Chamber of Dep.: 1921: 49,073; 1930: 53,385; Senate: 1921: 96,564; 1930: 105,047	XIX.	Lipt. Sv. Mikuláš	6	248,702	41,450	260,453	43,409	IX.	Lipt. Sv. Mikuláš	7	577,845	82,549	607,947	86,850
Slovakia Districts: 7 Population: 2,993,479; 1930: 3,256,468 Seats; Chamber of Dep.: 61; Senate: 31 Inhabitants per seat Chamber of Dep.: 1921: 49,073; 1930: 53,385; Senate: 1921: 96,564; 1930: 105,047	XXI.	Prešov	10	435,182	43,518	464,357	46,436	X.	Prešov	5	435,182	87,036	464,357	92,871
Slovakia Districts: 7 Population: 2,993,479; 1930: 3,256,468 Seats; Chamber of Dep.: 61; Senate: 31 Inhabitants per seat Chamber of Dep.: 1921: 49,073; 1930: 53,385; Senate: 1921: 96,564; 1930: 105,047	XVI.	Nové Zámky	11	629,458	57,223	706,999	64,273	XI.	Nové Zámky	9	1,030,127	114,459	1,139,099	126,567
Slovakia Districts: 7 Population: 2,993,479; 1930: 3,256,468 Seats; Chamber of Dep.: 61; Senate: 31 Inhabitants per seat Chamber of Dep.: 1921: 49,073; 1930: 53,385; Senate: 1921: 96,564; 1930: 105,047	XX.	Košice	7	400,669	57,238	432,100	61,729	XI.	Nové Zámky	9	1,030,127	114,459	1,139,099	126,567
Subcarpathian Rus' Districts: 1	(XXIII.); XXII.	Užhorod	9	605,731	67,303	706,850	78,539	(XIII.); XII.	Užhorod	4	605,731	151,433	706,850	176,713

== Party system ==
Only accredited parties could present candidates for election. With the proportional representation list vote system and ethno-linguistic pluralism, many different political parties flourished. Parties were divided along class, ethnic, religious and regional lines. After the formation of Czechoslovakia, new parties had begun to be formed in Slovakia whilst established Czech parties immediately expanded their activities to Slovak areas.

The greatest vote-share any single party ever managed in a national election was 25.7%, earned by the Czechoslovak Social Democratic Workers Party (ČSDSD) in the 1920 election, and no other party received as much as 16% in any elections of the First Republic. Thus coalition governments with the support of several parties became a necessity.

== 1920 election ==
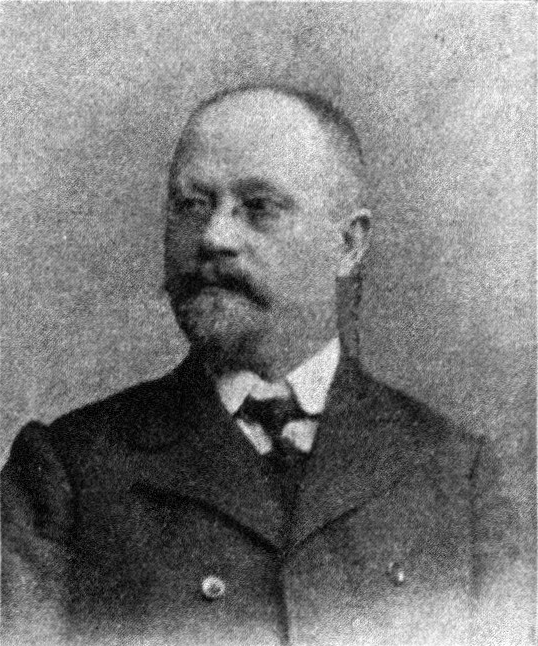
Antonín Němec, leader of the ČSDSD

Voting for the Chamber of Deputies occurred on April 18, 1920, and voting for the Senate was held a week later on April 25, 1920. 281 members of the Chamber of Deputies were elected, as no elections were held in the Hlučín Region (part of the Moravská Ostrava electoral district, resulting in 1 fewer deputy elected from that district), the Těšín electoral district (9 deputies) and the Užhorod electoral district (9 deputies). 23 parties contested the election; 16 won parliamentary representation. The ČSDSD emerged as the largest party in the 1920 election, with 25.7% of the vote for the Chamber of Deputies, 74 deputies elected, 28.1% of the vote for the Senate and 41 senators elected. There was also the German Social Democratic Workers Party in the Czechoslovak Republic (DSAP) with 11.1% of the Chamber of Deputies vote, 31 deputies and 16 senators, as well as the Hungarian-German Social Democratic Party with 1.8% of the Chamber of Deputies vote and 4 deputies. The Czechoslovak People's Party (ČSL) became the second largest party in the parliament with 11.3% of the Chamber of Deputies vote, 33 deputies, 11.9% of the Senate vote and 18 senators.

Among Czech voters, the 1920 election outcome was marked by remarkable stability compared to the 1911 election. The gap between Czech socialist and bourgeois parties had only moved by 0.4% compared to the 1911 result.

== 1924 election in Subcarpathian Rus' ==
Elections for representatives to the Czechoslovak parliament from Subcarpathian Rus' did not take place in 1920, as the area remained under a joint military-civilian administration. A by-election for deputies to the Czechoslovak parliament from the Užhorod electoral district (i.e. Subcarpathian Rus') was held on March 16, 1924. The Communist Party of Czechoslovakia (KSČ) emerged as the winner of the election.

== 1925 re-districting ==
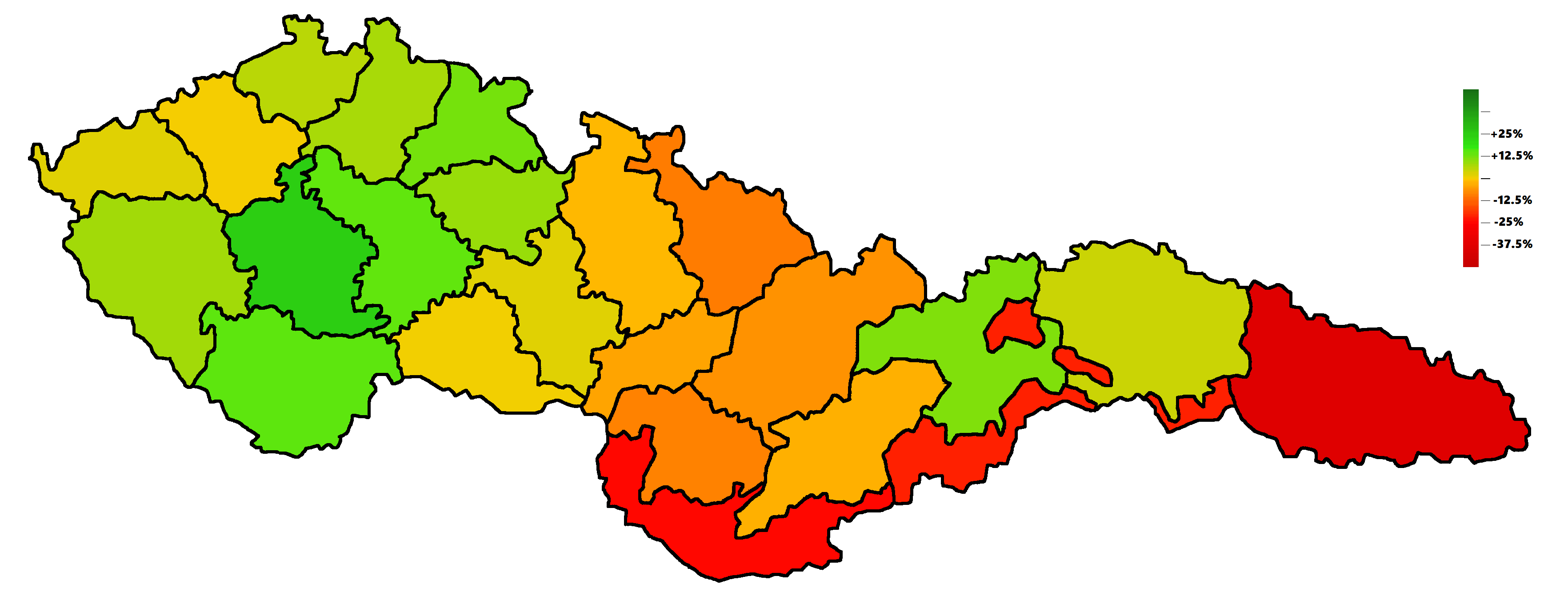
Map showing difference in percentage in variation from the average number of inhabitants per seat to the Czechoslovak Chamber of Deputies, as per the 1930 census data. The variations ranged from +24.30% (Prague A) to −38.55% (Užhorod).

Ahead of the 1925 parliamentary election, the 1920 electoral law was amended, resulting in the abolition of the Těšín electoral district (following the decision of the Conference of Ambassadors on the Polish-Czechoslovak border conflict). About half of the territory of the Těšín electoral district had been awarded to Poland by the decision of the Conference of Ambassadors July 28, 1920. The areas of the erstwhile Těšín district that remained in Czechoslovakia became part of the Moravská Ostrava electoral district.

The nine Chamber of Deputies seats that had been allocated to Těšín in 1920 were re-allocated to the Prague (3), Brno (1) and Moravská Ostrava (5) electoral districts. One of the Těšín Senate seats was allocated to Prague, the remaining three went to Moravská Ostrava.

Moreover, the Prague electoral district was divided into two subdistricts, I A and I B, which each would elect 24 members of the Chamber of Deputies.

No further changes in the distribution of seats of the Chamber of Deputies would take place ahead of the 1929 and 1935 elections.

== 1925 election ==
The 1925 Chamber of Deputies and Senate elections were held on November 15, 1925. 39 parties presented candidates, and 16 parties won seats. The Republican Party of Farmers and Peasants (RSZML) was the party with the most votes, with 13.7% of the Chamber of Deputies vote, 45 deputies, 13.8% of the Senate vote and 23 senators. With the Social Democracy divided, the Communist Party became the second largest party in parliament, with 13.2% of the Chamber of Deputies vote, 41 deputies and 20 senators. Hlinka's Slovak People's Party (HSĽS) emerged as a major force in Slovakia. With 34.3% of the votes from Slovakia, 23 deputies and 12 senators, the party was by far the largest in Slovakia.

== Act 56 (1927) ==
Act 56 of 1927 disenfranchised members of the armed forces and the gendarmerie from voting in parliamentary elections.

== 1929 election ==
The 1929 parliamentary election was held on October 27, 1929. The RSZML retained its position as the largest party, with 15% of the Chamber of Deputies vote, followed by the ČSDSD with 13%. In Slovakia, HSĽS suffered a setback. It had renounced its government participation earlier the same month. The party obtained 28.3% of the votes in Slovakia: 19 deputies and 9 senators.

== 1935 election ==
SdP election poster. Text reads: "Protect the German homeland – Elect Konrad Henlein's men".

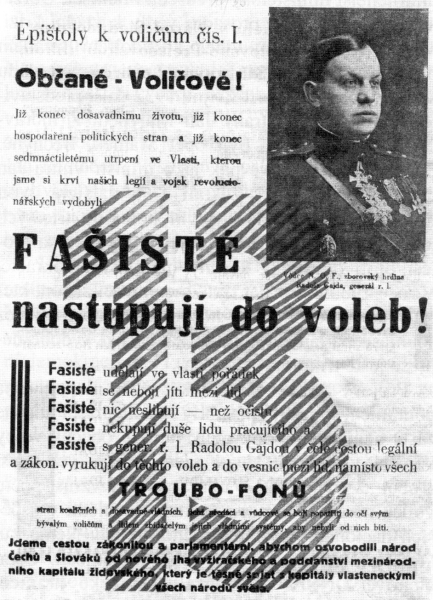
Election campaign leaflet of the National Fascist Community for the 1935 election

The 1935 parliamentary election was held on May 19, 1935. The Sudeten German Party (SdP) became the largest party in parliament, with 15.2% of the Chamber of Deputies vote, 44 deputies and 23 senators.
