= Kolohousenka =

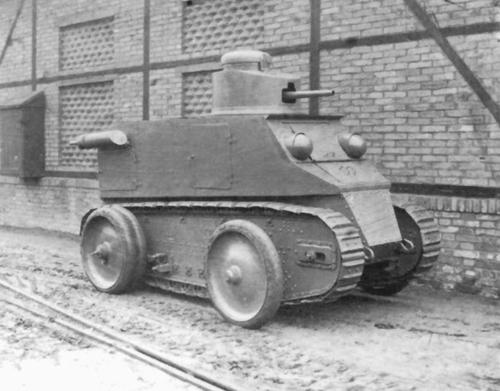
- Kolohousenka KH-60
- Type: Wheeled/tracked light tank
- Place of origin: Czechoslovakia

Production history
- Designer: Skoda, ČKD, Tatra
- Designed: 1923
- Manufacturer: Skoda, ČKD, Tatra
- Produced: 1923−1930
- No. built: 4
- Variants: 3

Specifications
- Mass: 7.5 t (8.3 short tons)
- Length: 4.50 m (14 ft 9 in)
- Width: 2.39 m (7 ft 10 in)
- Height: 2.53 m (8 ft 4 in)
- Crew: 2 (commander/gunner, driver)
- Armor: 14mm front
- Main armament: KH-60: 1× 37mm ÚV vz. 38; KH-70: 2x Schwarzlose machine gun
- Engine: Hanomag WD 50PS; KH-50: 50 hp (37 kW) KH-60: 60 hp (45 kW) KH-70: 70 hp (52 kW)
- Suspension: torsion bar
- Operational range: 300 km
- Maximum speed: 15 km/h (9.3 mph) tracks 35 km/h (22 mph)wheels

Kolohousenka was a series of Czechoslovak wheeled and tracked light tanks developed by Škoda, ČKD and Tatra.

== Development ==
After the appearance of tanks in World War I, Czechoslovakia began to build their own tanks. As two disadvantages of tanks are the low durability of the tracks and slow speed, the Czechoslovak Army decided to build a vehicle which could run on both tracks and wheels.

In 1923, the Czechoslovak Army acquired a blueprint for a tank with tracks and wheels from the German engineer, Joseph Vollmer. Skoda, ČKD and Tatra produced the first two prototypes of the Kolohousenka series under the designation KH-50, KH for Kolohousenka and 50 for the engine size in horsepower.

== KH-50 ==
The KH-50 was meant to be an artillery tractor and was built on the chassis of the Hanomag WD-50 tractor. The vehicle was operated by a crew of two and the driver was seated at the front.

The chassis combined wheels with tracks. The wheeled chassis could be lowered and lifted, giving the vehicle optimum performance when traveling on the road as well as off-road. The vehicle needed about 15 minutes to switch from wheels to tracks with the aid of a ramp.

The KH-50 had 14 mm (0.55 in) of armour at the front and was powered by a 50 hp (37 kW) engine at the rear. The speed was 15 km/h (9.3 mph) on tracks and 35 km/h (22 mph) on wheels.

The two prototypes underwent trials, but both broke down after a short period of time. One of the prototypes was badly damaged and was scrapped. The Czechoslovak Army rejected the prototype, and no serial production was started.

Škoda, ČKD and Tatra continued to work on the project and came up with two variants, the KH-60 with a 60 hp engine installed and the KH-70 with an upgraded 70 hp engine and two machine guns as the primary armament.

== KH-60 ==
The KH-60 was the first tank built in the Kolohousenka series. The KH-60 was a modification of the sole surviving KH-50.

The KH-60 was fitted with a 3.7 cm Skoda D/27 mounted in a cylindrical turret. The engine was upgraded to 60 hp (45 kW). Two KH-60 were built and exported to USSR.

== KH-70 ==
The KH-70 was another variant of the KH-50 in the Kolohousenka series.

The KH-70 was fitted with two Schwarzlose machine guns in the turret. The engine was upgraded to 70 hp (52 kW) and a tail piece was attached to the rear to help the vehicle cross trenches. One KH-70 was built and exported to Italy.

== KH-100 ==
The KH-100 was a powerful wheel-cum tractor built with a 100 hp engine in the end of 1930. only one prototype was built.

== See also ==
- Schofield tank
- BT tank

== Bibliography ==
- Kliment, Charles K. & Francev, Vladimír (1997). Czechoslovak Armored Fighting Vehicles 1918-1948. Atlgen, Pennsylvania: Schiffer Publishing. ISBN 0-7643-0141-1.
