= Vz. 24 =

Bolt-action rifle

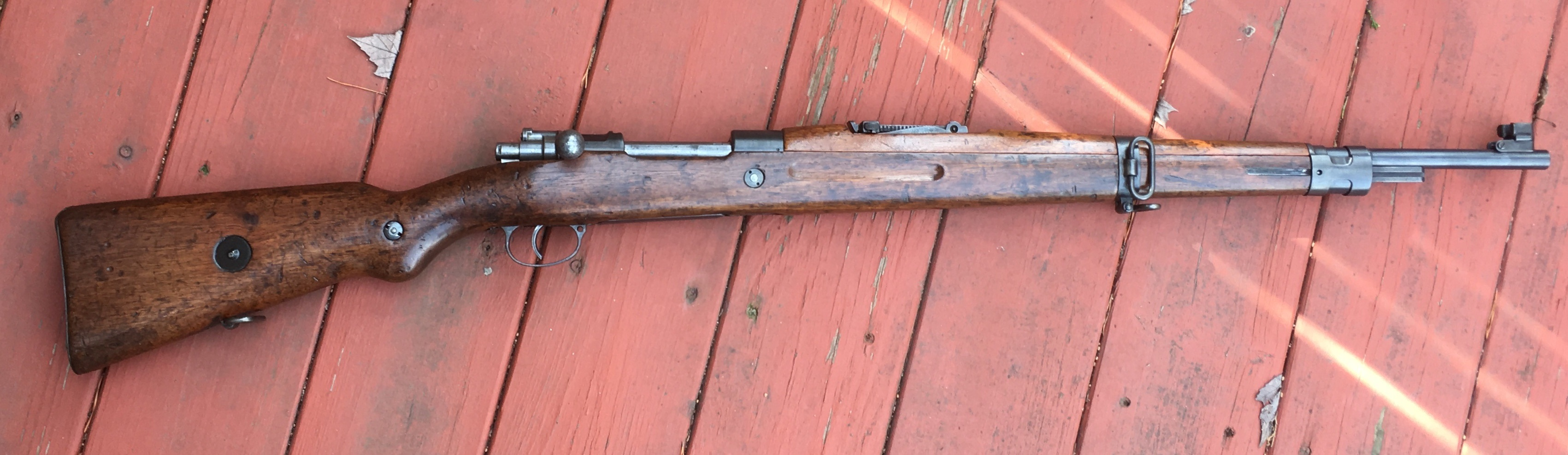
- Type: Bolt-action rifle
- Place of origin: Czechoslovakia

Service history
- Used by: See Users
- Wars: Constitutionalist Revolution; Chaco War; Ecuadorian–Peruvian War; Spanish Civil War; Second Sino-Japanese War; World War II; Chinese Civil War; Korean War; Biafran War

Production history
- Designed: 1924
- Manufacturer: Zbrojovka Brno
- Produced: 1924–1942

Specifications
- Mass: 4.2 kg (9.2 lb)
- Length: 1,100 mm (43.3 in)
- Barrel length: 590 mm (23.23 in)
- Cartridge: 7.92×57mm Mauser, 7×57mm Mauser, 7.65×53mm Argentine
- Action: Bolt-action
- Feed system: 5-round internal box magazine, two-row, integral box, with detachable floorplate
- Sights: Iron sights

The vz. 24 rifle is a bolt-action carbine designed and produced in Czechoslovakia from 1924 to 1942. It was developed from the German Mauser Gewehr 98 line, and features a similar bolt design. The rifle was designed in Czechoslovakia shortly after World War I, to replace the Vz. 98/22, also a Czech derivative of the Gewehr 98. The vz. 24 featured a 590 mm (23.2 in) barrel which was shorter and considered more manageable than the 740 mm (29.1 in) Gewehr 98 barrel. The vz. 24 was chambered in 7.92×57mm Mauser like its predecessors.

Throughout the late 1920s and into the 1930s, Czechoslovakia exported hundreds of thousands of vz. 24 rifles to various countries across the globe, with variants chambered in the original 7.92×57mm Mauser, 7×57mm Mauser, and 7.65×53mm Argentine. These included contracts for several South American countries, most of which were 7 mm or 7.65 mm guns. Around 40,000 rifles were sent to Spanish Republican forces during the Spanish Civil War. Nearly 200,000 rifles were purchased by China, seeing action in the Second Sino-Japanese War and World War II. Iran purchased vz. 24 rifles, along with two other variants, through the late 1920s and 1930s, and later produced their own copies in the late 1940s.

Germany acquired hundreds of thousands of the rifles in 1939 when they occupied Czechoslovakia and pressed them into service under the designation "Gewehr 24(t)"; during the occupation, production of the rifles continued until 1942, when the factories were converted to the German Karabiner 98k. During this period, several hundred thousand rifles were also built for the Romanian Army. Vz. 24 rifles saw extensive service during World War II in multiple theaters, predominantly with the German and Romanian armies on the Eastern Front. Lithuanian vz. 24s, which had been captured during the German invasion in 1941, were later seized by Soviet forces, who in turn used them to arm the Viet Cong during the Vietnam War in the 1960s.

== Development and service with the Czechoslovak Army ==
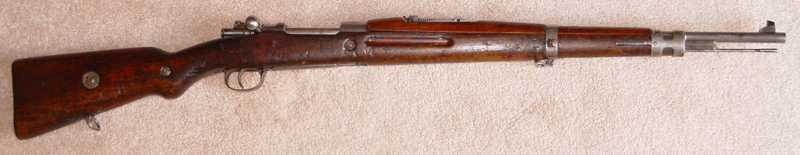
vz. 24 rifle

After World War I, the Austro-Hungarian Empire was dismantled; one of the new states to emerge from the ruins of the Habsburg Monarchy was Czechoslovakia. The new state received control of the Skoda factory in Brno, which was renamed the Brno Arms Works in November 1918. The following year, the factory began producing the first short rifles based on the German Gewehr 98 design, the Mauser Jelená. At least 150 of the rifles were chambered in 7mm Mauser, with at least as many also chambered in 7.92×57mm Mauser. The original Gewehr 98 rifle featured a barrel that was 740 mm (29 in) long, which proved to be too long and cumbersome in the trench fighting of World War I. Nevertheless, Brno developed the long vz. 98/22 in 1922 from the basic Gewehr 98 design, with a 740 mm (29.13 in) long barrel, along with a vz. 98/22 Short Rifle variant, though it did not see significant production.

Starting in 1923, Brno decided to develop a rifle based on the German Karabiner 98AZ, a shortened version of the Gewehr 98 with a 590 mm (23.23 in) barrel. This resulted in the vz. 23, a rifle with a 550 mm (21.5 in) long barrel that was initially produced with parts cannibalized from other rifles. The design was further refined into the vz. 23A, which consisted of newly manufactured components. Further refinements produced the vz. 24, which entered production in 1924. That year, Brno Arms Works, which had been controlled by the Czechoslovak government, was privatized to encourage export sales.

The vz.24 became the primary rifle of the Czechoslovak Army before World War II. It resembled the German Karabiner 98k, which it predated by more than a decade. Unlike the K98k, the vz. 24 has a longer top handguard, and it retains a straight bolt handle. Between 1924 and 1938, Czechoslovakia manufactured more than 775,600 rifles, with the first rifles entering service in 1926. The final order was placed in July 1938, as tensions escalated with Nazi Germany over the Sudeten Germans. Following the German occupation of Czechoslovakia, production continued for the Slovak Republic (a Nazi client state). The exact number of rifles manufactured between 1938 and 1939 is unknown, but may be less than 10,000, based on serial numbers of surviving rifles.

=== Description ===
The vz. 24 was a bolt-action design based on the Mauser action, featuring a straight bolt handle. The rifle's barrel, which was 590 millimeters (23.23 in) long, featured 4-groove rifling with a right-hand twist. Overall, the rifle was 1,100 mm (43.3 in) long, and it weighed 4.2 kilograms (9.2 lb). The primary chambering was for 7.92×57mm Mauser, but export variants were also chambered for 7×57mm Mauser and 7.65×53mm Argentine. Ammunition was stored in a five-round, fixed, internal magazine that fit flush with the bottom of the stock, which was fed with stripper clips. The rifles were fitted with tangent rear sights that were graduated in 50-meter (55 yd) increments, up to a maximum range of 2,000 m (2,187 yd). The front sight blade was fitted with a protector to prevent it from being damaged.

The rifle's stock featured a semi-pistol grip and an upper hand guard that extended from the forward receiver ring to the forward barrel band. Sling swivels were placed on the bottom rear of the butt and the left side of the grip and on the rear barrel band. Grasping grooves were placed just forward of the recoil lug to aid in handling the rifle. A cleaning rod was stored in the stock under the barrel.

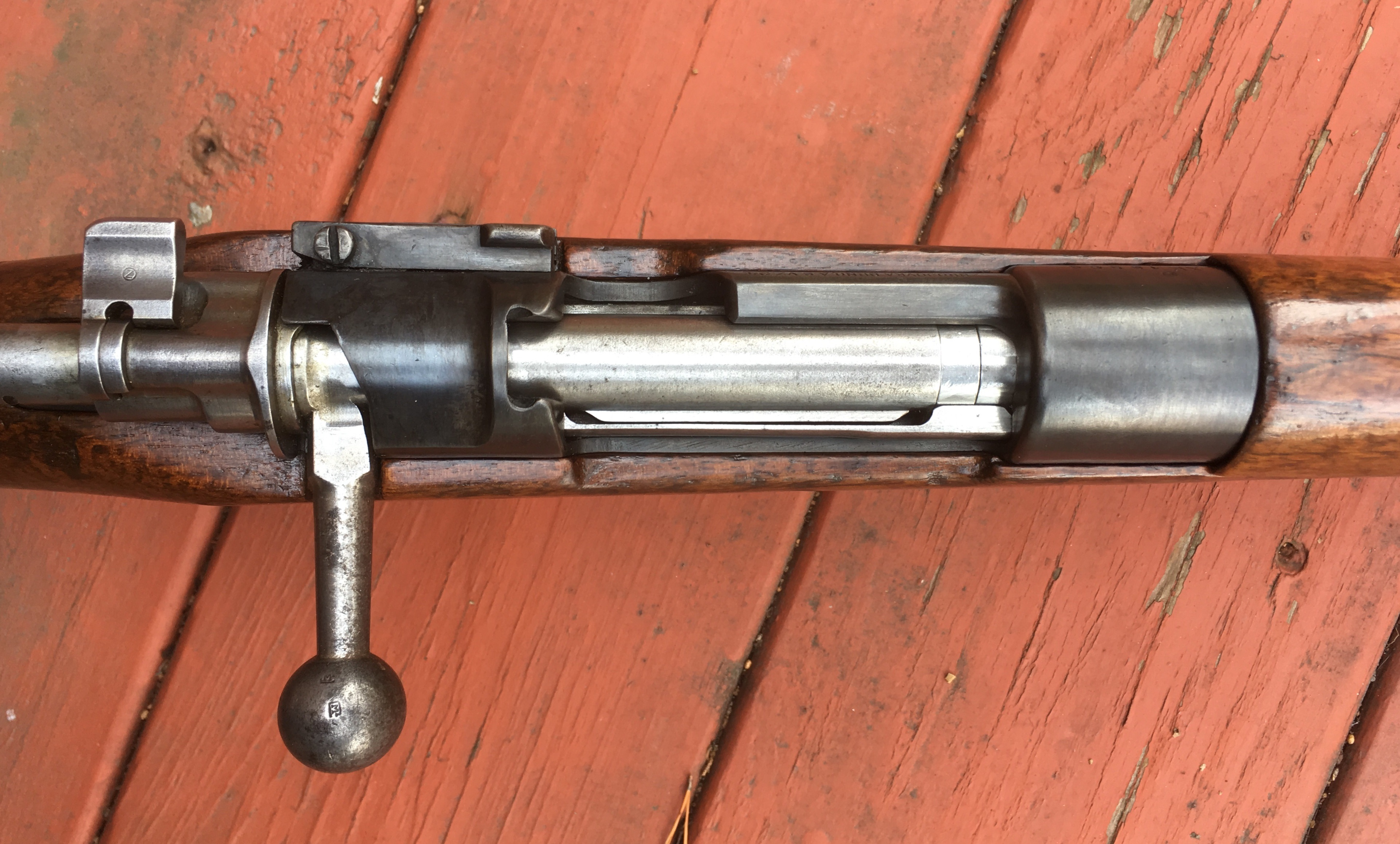
Receiver of a Romanian-contract vz. 24

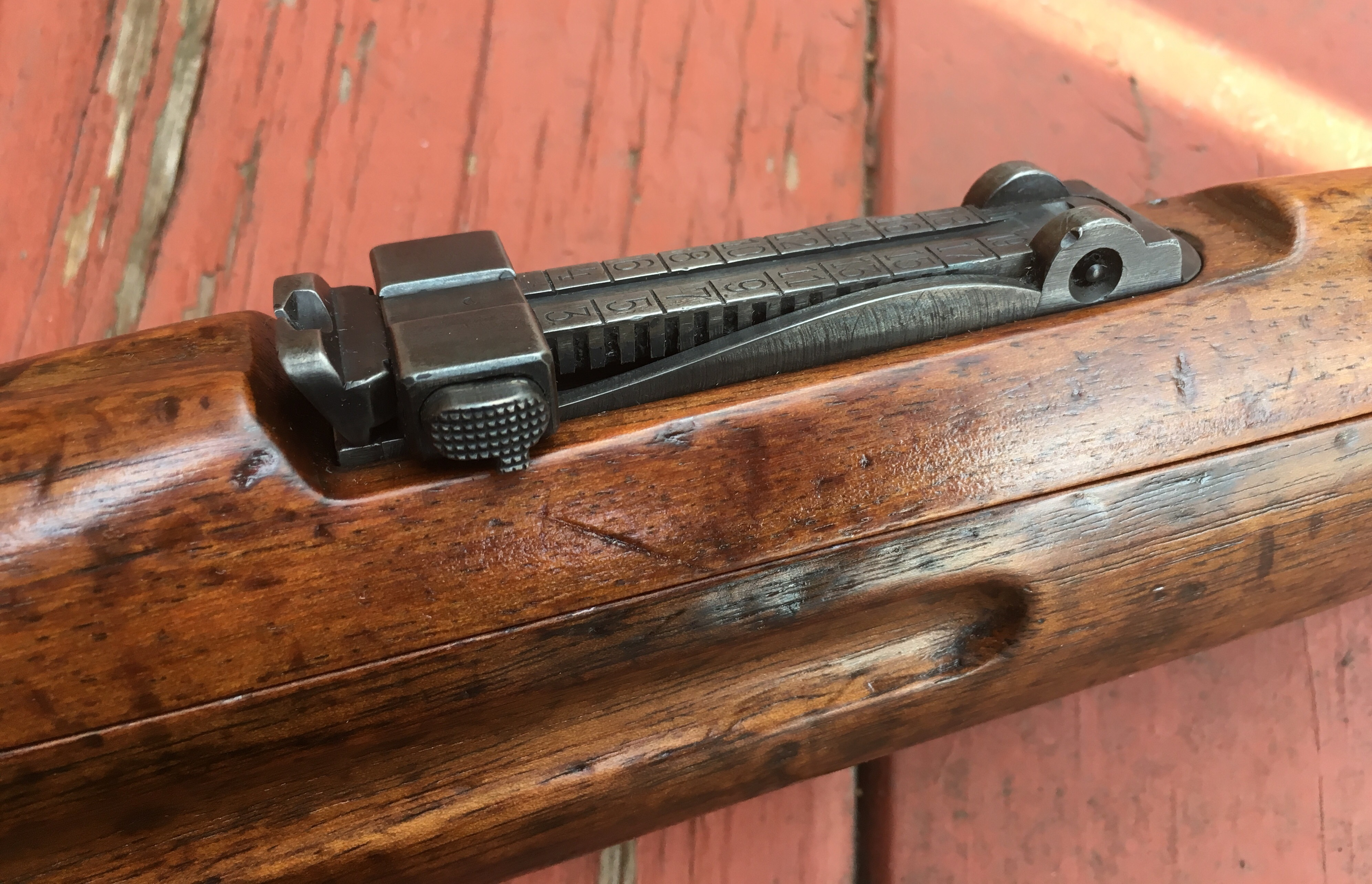
Tangent rear sight

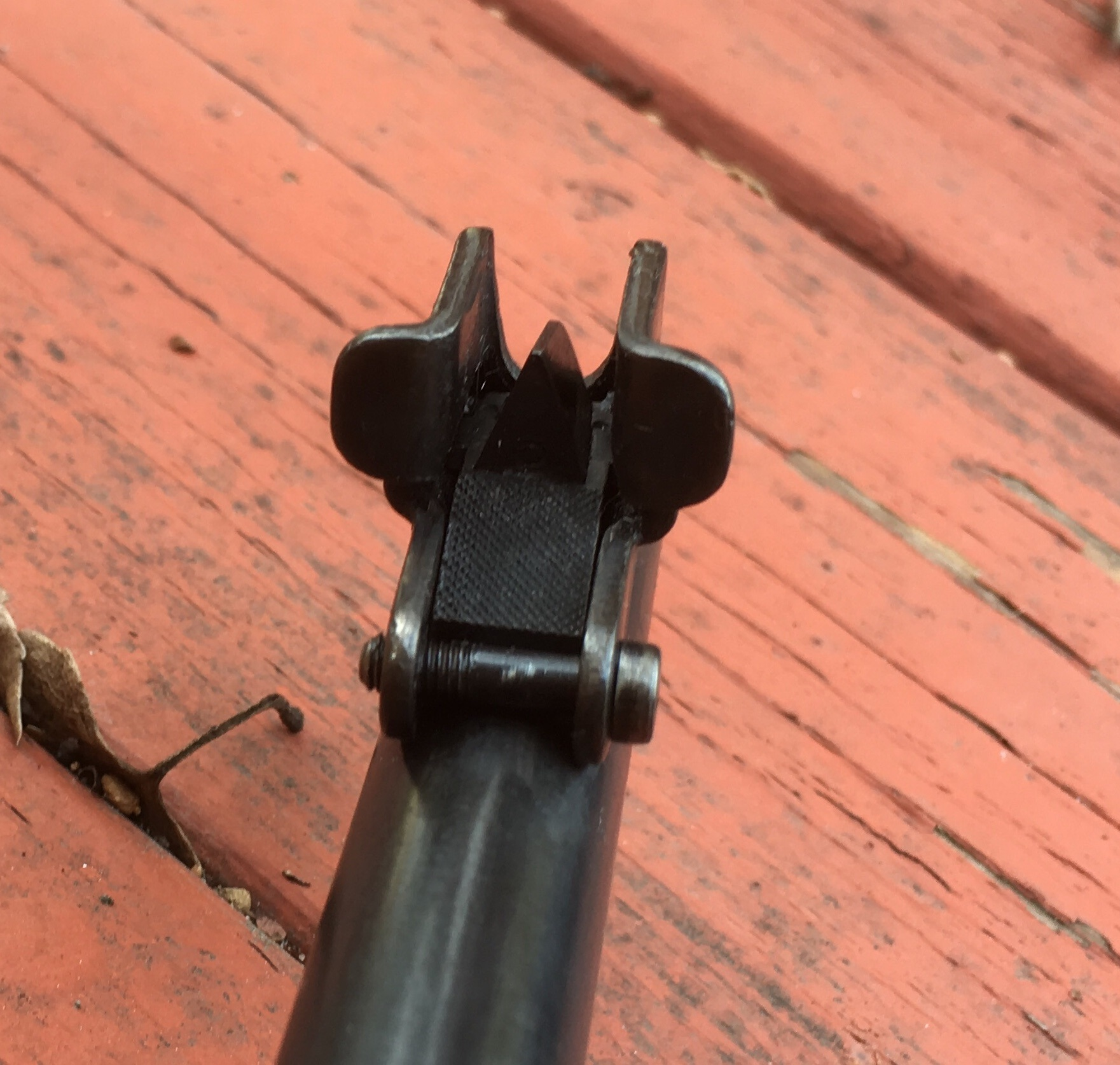
Front sight

== Export and foreign combat employment ==
Many South American countries purchased the vz. 24 rifle in various calibers. Between 1928 and 1938, the Bolivian Army purchased 101,000 vz. 24 rifles, which were chambered in 7.65×53mm Argentine. These rifles were used against Paraguay during the Chaco War in the 1930s, and many of them were captured by the Paraguayan Army, which in turn used them against Bolivia. Colombia ordered 10,000 rifles between 1929 and 1937 and Venezuela purchased an unknown number of rifles in 1930; both countries' rifles were chambered in 7 mm. In 1932, Brazilian revolutionaries ordered 15,000 rifles, which were built with bent bolt handles. Peru ordered 5,000 rifles chambered in 7 mm in 1934, and Ecuador purchased 30,000 rifles in 7.92 mm in 1936. Guatemala and El Salvador ordered 4,000 and 300 7.92 mm rifles in 1937, respectively, and Nicaragua purchased 1,000 7 mm rifles that year. Also in 1937, Uruguay ordered 6,000 rifles in 7 mm, of which 2,000 were vz. 32/Modelo 1932 variants, which were essentially lightened vz. 24s.

Several European countries also acquired the rifle, all in the 7.92 mm caliber. The Lithuanian Army acquired the vz. 24 in the 1930s, and many of these rifles were captured by German forces during Operation Barbarossa before falling into the hands of the Soviet Army later in the war. Some of these rifles were then sent to Vietnam to arm the Viet Cong, and some were captured a third time by American forces during the Vietnam War. Yugoslavia purchased 40,000 rifles in 1926, all of which came from Czechoslovak Army stockpiles, and a further 10,000+ between 1928 and 1930. These rifles saw action during World War II during the German invasion of Yugoslavia in April 1941, as well as during the Partisans' insurgency against the German occupation. In 1935, Latvia traded surplus No. 1 Mk. III Lee–Enfield rifles for 15,000 vz. 24s; Brno Arms Works in turn sold the Lee–Enfields to Iraq. During World War II, Latvian resistance fighters employed the vz. 24s that had been ordered by the Latvian Army against the German occupation forces.

The vz. 24 also saw action in the Spanish Civil War by the Catalan Republican troops. About 40,000 vz. 24s were bought by the Soviet Union from Czechoslovakia to be sent to the Spanish Civil War. The vz. 24s were shipped from Murmansk on 1 March 1938, along with other material (T-26 tanks and 76 mm French field artillery). The French freighter Gravelines, which carried all the material, managed to get the weapons to Bordeaux from where they were sent by land across the border to Catalonia. Despite arriving late in the war, the vz. 24 was used in Catalonia and the Mediterranean coast of the Iberian Peninsula and saw action in the Battle of the Ebro, where the vz. 24 showed good results despite the Francoist-Nationalist victory. After the defeat of the Second Spanish Republic, Generalissimo Francisco Franco kept the rifles that survived the battle until 1959, when they were sold to Interarms.

Starting in 1927, the Chinese Nationalist government began ordering rifles, and by 1937 had purchased 195,000 vz. 24s. They saw action during the Second Sino-Japanese War in the late 1930s and many of these rifles were captured by Japanese forces. They were then used to arm five infantry divisions stationed in China as well as the Collaborationist Chinese Army. After the war, Japan surrendered the rifles to China, which were then issued to Nationalist forces for use during the Chinese Civil War. China manufactured a copy of the vz. 24 that featured a shorter barrel and a side folding bayonet. Some of these rifles were captured by the People's Liberation Army and used in Korea. Japan also ordered 40,000 rifles for the Imperial Japanese Navy in 1938.

After World War II, rifles from Czechoslovakia were sent to Iraq. In 1967, the secessionist state of Biafra ordered various weapons from Czechoslovakia, including 1,860 vz. 24 rifles.

=== German G24(t) ===
After the occupation of Czechoslovakia in 1938, the Germans took existing stocks of the vz.24 into service under the designation Gewehr 24(t) ('t' being the national origin designator tschechoslowakisch, the German word for "Czechoslovak"; such national origin designators were German practice for all foreign weapons taken into service). The G24(t) rifles manufactured after the German occupation were completed to a modified design to adhere to German standards. This included changes to the butt stock, with slots cut to fit German slings and the installation of the disc and hollow rod assembly that allowed soldiers to disassemble their bolts. Brno continued production of the rifle, which progressively gained some K98k features as stocks of pre-war components were used up. The original flat butt plate was replaced with the cupped butt plate of the K98k type, and the walnut stocks were replaced with easier-to-produce laminate versions.

In 1942, the production line at the Považská Bystrica plant was converted entirely to building K98k rifles and the main plant in Brno was similarly converted the following year. Over the course of 1941 and 1942, a total between 255,000 and 330,000 G24(t) rifles were built before production switched over to the K98ks. The G24(t) rifles did not receive the old Czechoslovak stampings, and instead only bore standard army proof marks and Waffenamt inspection codes.

=== Romanian vz. 24s ===
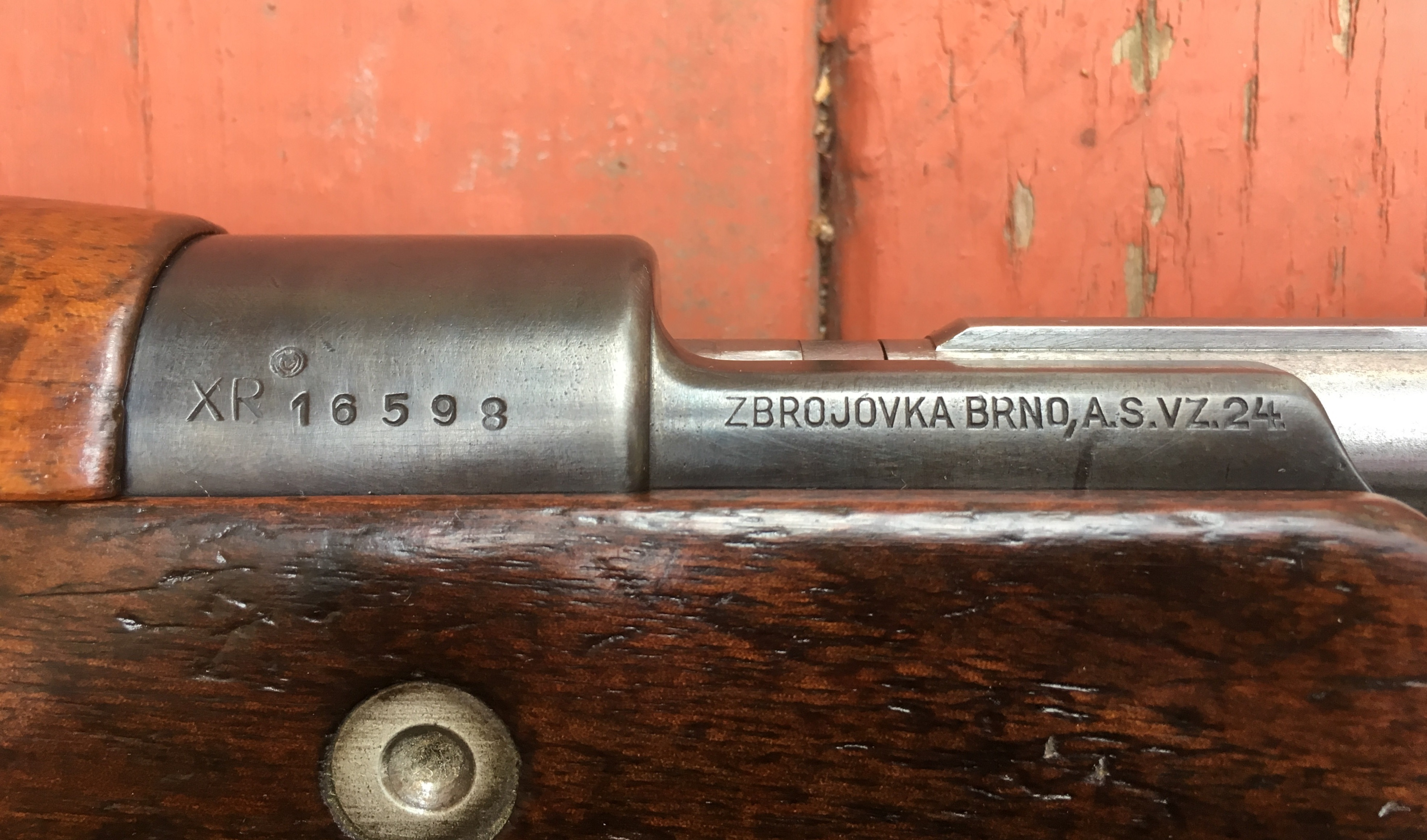
Romanian-contract vz. 24 showing the serial number prefaced with the "XR" code

In the late 1920s and early 1930s, the Romanian Army decided to adopt the vz. 24 rifle as its standard infantry rifle, though it had not acquired enough weapons to fully arm its troops by the time the country entered World War II in 1941. The first orders for the vz. 24 rifles were placed in 1938 after the German invasion. Romanian-contract vz. 24s have a two-letter prefix at the start of the serial number, the first letter being variable and the second "R" to designate Romania. Each initial letter denotes manufacturing blocks of 25,000 rifles. Romanian vz. 24s "AR", "BR", "CR" through "YR" represent different periods of manufacturing, though several blocks have not been reported, including "IR", "JR", "KR", "MR", "NR", "QR", "VR", and "ZR". Over the course of the contract, the Czechs manufactured between 400,000 and 750,000 Romanian vz. 24s. The first two years of production included royal crests for the King of Romania, though rifles built from 1940 onward do not feature crests, and many of the surviving early rifles have had their crests ground off. By mid-1943, 445,640 rifles had been received by the Romanian Army.

Romania was part of the Axis for much of World War II, from 1941 to 1944. Romanian vz. 24s saw action in Ukraine, Bessarabia, and in particularly heavy fighting during the Battle of Stalingrad. It was not until 1944, after significant defeats at the hands of the Soviet Red Army, that Romania joined the Allies.

=== Iranian Brno ===
In 1929, Iran ordered 30,000 vz. 24 rifles chambered in 7.92 mm, all of which came from Czechoslovak Army stocks. A further order for 240,000 rifles was placed in 1930, though these were for the vz.98/29 variant with a longer barrel; another order for 30,000 vz. 98/29 "musketon" rifles was placed at the same time. Like several other countries' orders, the initial contract for the 30,000 vz. 24s came from Czechoslovak Army stocks, while the later orders for the vz. 98/29 variants were new production guns. The total order was not completed before Czechoslovakia was conquered by Germany. The "musketon" rifles were designated as the Model 30 carbine, and in the late 1940s, Czechoslovakia assisted the Iranians with setting up a factory to manufacture their own license-built copies, the Model 49 carbine.

The rifles, which were referred to as "Brnos" or "Bernos", after their city of manufacture, proved to be prized by Iran's various tribal groups, which frequently rebelled against the government of the Shah. After Reza Shah was deposed in 1941 by the Anglo-Soviet invasion of Iran, significant numbers of the rifles fell into the hands of tribal rebels, and they were used in tribal conflicts throughout the 1950s. During the Anglo-Soviet occupation, the Soviets seized and distributed 10,000 of the Brnos to Kurdish tribes in western Iran, which they also helped to train. The Kurdish force proved to be the basis of the Peshmerga.

== Users ==
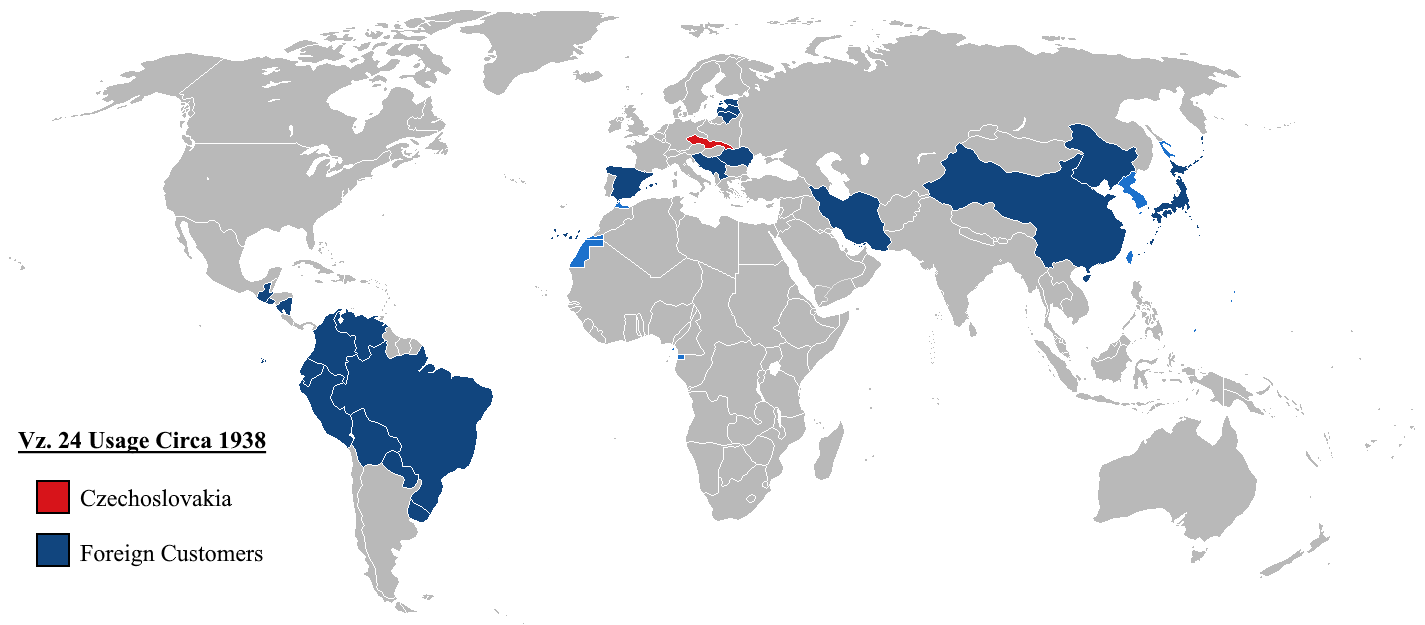
Users of the Vz. 24 rifle circa 1938.

- Biafra
- Bolivia
- Brazil
- China
- Colombia
- Czechoslovakia
- Ecuador
- El Salvador
- Estonia
- Guatemala
- Pahlavi Iran
- Iraq
- Empire of Japan
- Latvia
- Lithuania
- Nazi Germany
- Nicaragua
- North Korea
- Paraguay
- Peru
- Romania
- Slovakia
- Spain
- Syria
- Turkey
- Uruguay
- Venezuela
- Viet Cong
- Yugoslavia

== See also ==
- vz. 33
- M24 series
- List of common World War II infantry weapons
- Weapons of Czechoslovakia interwar period
