= Škoda 220 mm howitzer =

WWII Czechoslovak siege howitzer

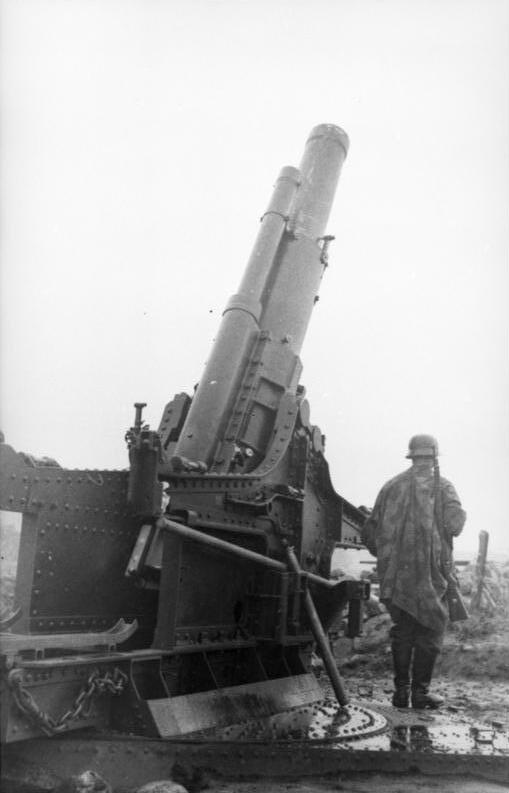
- Škoda 220 mm howitzer in German coastal battery, 1943
- Type: siege howitzer
- Place of origin: Czechoslovakia

Service history
- In service: 1928−1945
- Used by: See users
- Wars: World War II

Production history
- Designer: Škoda
- Manufacturer: Škoda
- Produced: 1928−1935
- No. built: 39

Specifications
- Mass: in action:14.7 t (32,000 lb) travelling:22.7 t (50,000 lb)
- Length: 4.34 m (171 in)
- Barrel length: 4.18 m (165 in)
- Width: 3 m (120 in)
- Crew: 17
- Shell: 128 kg (282 lb)
- Caliber: 220 mm (8.7 in)
- Carriage: siege mount
- Elevation: +4° to +75°
- Traverse: 360°
- Rate of fire: 0.2 rpm
- Muzzle velocity: 500 metres per second (1,600 ft/s)
- Maximum firing range: 14,200 m (15,500 yd)

The Škoda 220 mm howitzer was a siege howitzer design which served with Germany, Poland, and Yugoslavia before and during World War II.

== Description ==
The 220 mm howitzers were a compromise design for their time, with decent capability to destroy fortifications and yet still mobile. Constructively, the design shared many features with the 149 mm Škoda Model 1928 gun. The howitzer used only an immobile, fully-traversable siege mount which had to be offloaded from the transport platform into a shallow (0.5 m deep) pit before firing. Typical preparation time was three hours. The Škoda 220 mm howitzer utilized a hydro-pneumatic recoil system. Loading was manual, with separate shell and the bags of the propellant allowing nine different propelling charges. For transport, the howitzer was disassembled into three loads, each towed by a separate eight-ton tractor. The maximal towing speed was 30 kilometres per hour (19 mph).

== History ==
The K-series was an entirely new design by the Škoda Works company of Czechoslovakia. Although the exact development schedule is unknown, the first contract to deliver 12 artillery pieces was signed with the Kingdom of Yugoslavia in 1928. The howitzers were locally designated as M.28. In October 1929, a Polish delegation also evaluated the design. The contract to deliver 27 artillery pieces to Poland was signed in 1933, with actual deliveries happening circa 1934-1935. At least 14 Škoda 220 mm howitzers were captured by German forces from Poland in September 1939 and re-designated 22 cm Mörser (p). Also, some howitzers were captured in April 1941 from Yugoslavia and re-designated 22 cm Mörser 538(j). Finally, 7 howitzers were captured by the Soviet Union from Poland and were re-used against Finland during the Winter War. The Army of Czechoslovakia had also considered adopting gun, but the plans were abandoned. The fragmentation (anti-personnel) shell for the howitzer was developed in Poland by June 1939, and at least 60 fragmentation shells were produced under German occupation.

=== Known German coastal batteries using 22 cm Mörser 538 ===
- Battery 47/977 in Kroken and Hetlefloten (Norway), 6 pieces
- Battery 6/975 in Klinga Municipality (Norway), 3 pieces
- Battery 4/974 in Reitan in Tingvoll Municipality (Norway), 3 pieces

== Users ==
- Nazi Germany
- Poland − 37 in 1939, used by the 1st Superheavy Artillery Regiment
- Soviet Union
- Yugoslavia

== Bibliography ==
- Chamberlain, Peter & Gander, Terry. Heavy Artillery. New York: Arco, 1975 ISBN 0-668-03898-5
- Gander, Terry and Chamberlain, Peter. Weapons of the Third Reich: An Encyclopedic Survey of All Small Arms, Artillery and Special Weapons of the German Land Forces 1939-1945. New York: Doubleday, 1979 ISBN 0-385-15090-3
- Zaloga, Steven J; Madej, Victor (1991). The Polish Campaign, 1939. New York, NY: Hippocrene Books. ISBN 978-0-87052-013-6.
