= Škoda Fiat Torino =

Czechoslovak armored car

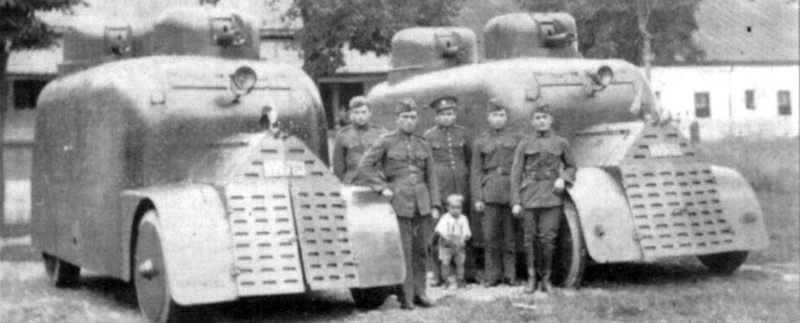
- Type: Armored car
- Place of origin: Czechoslovakia

Service history
- In service: 1920−1929
- Used by: Czechoslovakia

Production history
- Designer: Škoda
- Designed: 1919−1920
- Manufacturer: Škoda
- Produced: 1920
- No. built: 11+1 prototype

Specifications
- Mass: 6.900 kg (15,212 lb)
- Length: 5,43 m (17 ft 10 in)
- Width: 2,02 m (6 ft 6 3/4 in)
- Height: 2,65 m (8 ft 8 3/8 in)
- Crew: 5
- Armor: 5-6 mm
- Main armament: 2 x 7.92 mm (0.312 in) Schwarzlose MG vz. 07/24 machine guns
- Engine: 4-cylinder Fiat gasoline 64 horsepower (48 kW)
- Transmission: 4 x 2
- Suspension: leaf springs
- Maximum speed: 16 km/h (10 Mph)

The Škoda Fiat Torino was a Czechoslovak-designed armored car built by Škoda Works in 1920, based on the Italian Fiat 18BL truck.

== History ==
In 1919 the MNO (Czechoslovak Army Material Commission) sent specifications for Škoda for an armored vehicle that was to be both well armed and highly mobile. The Fiat 18BL was chosen for the chassis to speed up production as it had already been adopted by the army and was readily available. By January 1920 a prototype was completed, which was accepted after testing and a further eleven units were ordered and delivered the same year. These were initially numbered 3–14, but later designated NVII 753–764. The Torino's chassis featured dual rear wheels in a 4x2 configuration, with hard rubber tires and leaf springs. The hull consisted of a steel frame with 5-6mm steel plates attached with rivets. Armament consisted of two turrets fitted with water-cooled 7.92mm MG 08 machine guns, positioned off-axis to the center to allow greater fields of fire. Propulsion consisted of a 64 hp 4-cylinder Fiat engine which allowed the cars to reach a maximum speed of 10 mph. Several construction defects were found once the vehicles were put into service where they served as training vehicles. By 1925 eight vehicles were out of service and finally scrapped in 1928, with the last four being scrapped in 1929.
