= Fiat 18 =

Early 20th century Italian truck

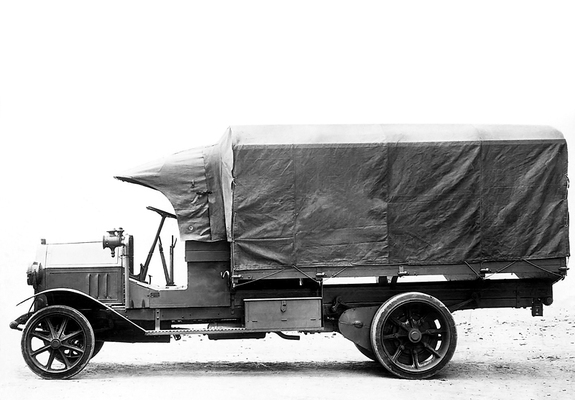
- Fiat 18BLR
- Type: 2 1/2 to 4 1/2 tonne truck
- Place of origin: Italy

Service history
- Used by: Italy, France, British Empire & Spanish Nationalists
- Wars: First World War & Spanish Civil War

Production history
- Designer: Carlo Cavalli
- Manufacturer: Fiat Veicoli Industriali
- Variants: Fiat 18A; Fiat 18M; Fiat 18BC; Fiat 18BL; Fiat 18BLR; Fiat 18P

Specifications (Fiat 18BL)
- Length: 5.55 m (18 ft 3 in) total 3.65 m (12 ft) wheelbase
- Width: 1.85 m (6 ft 1 in)
- Engine: Fiat 64CA; 5,655 cc (345.1 cu in); 4-cylinder inline petrol 38 bhp (28 kW) at 1300rpm
- Payload capacity: 3 1/2 t (3.9 short tons)
- Drive: Rear wheel drive
- Transmission: 4-forward, 1-reverse
- Maximum speed: 25 km/h (16 mph)
- References: Ellis & Vanderveen

The Fiat 18 is a truck model manufactured by the Italian firm Fiat Veicoli Industriali from 1913 to 1919. It was produced in a number of variants with payload capacities of 2 1/2 to 4 1/2 tonnes (2.8 to 5.0 short tons).

The Fiat 18 was used in very large numbers by the Italian military during the First World War, it was also used by the British and French Armies fighting in Italy during the war.

== Design ==
The Fiat 18 series included the Fiat 18A, Fiat 18M, Fiat 18BC, Fiat 18BL, Fiat 18BLR and Fiat 18P. All Fiat 18 variants were cab behind engine, rear-wheel drive trucks with chain driven rear wheels, 4-forward and 1-reverse transmissions. Payload capacities varied depending on variant, being between 2 1/2 and 4 1/2 tonnes (2.8 and 5.0 short tons).

The Fiat 18BC, had a payload capacity of 2 1/2 tonnes (2.8 short tons) and was powered by a Fiat 64BA 4,578 cc (279.4 cu in) 4-cylinder inline petrol engine which produced 25 hp (19 kW) at 1,200 rpm. It had a 3.25 m (10 ft 8 in) wheelbase and was 4.85 m (15 ft 11 in) in total length, gross vehicle mass was 5.9 tonnes (6.5 short tons).

The Fiat 18BL was designed for military use, it had a payload capacity of 3 1/2 tonnes (3.9 short tons) and was powered by a Fiat 64CA 5,655 cc (345.1 cu in) 4-cylinder inline petrol engine which produced 38 hp (28 kW) at 1,300 rpm. It had a 3.65 m (12 ft) wheelbase and was 5.55 m (18 ft 3 in) in total length, maximum speed was 25 km/h (16 mph).

The Fiat 18BLR was an improved 18BL, with heavier springs, smaller and wider wheels, and revised gear ratios. The 18BLR had a payload capacity of 4 1/2 tonnes (5 short tons) and was powered by a either the Fiat 64CA of the 18BL, or a larger Fiat 64DA 6,230 cc (380 cu in) 4-cylinder inline petrol engine which produced 40 hp (30 kW). It had retained the 3.65 m (12 ft) wheelbase of the 18BL but total length was increased to 5.85 m (19 ft 2 in), maximum speed was reduced to 21–23 km/h (13–14 mph). The Fiat 18BLR was also suitable for use as a tractor truck, towing artillery or various trailers, it was also used as an "autocannoni" anti-aircraft gun carrier fitted with a Cannone da 76/30 Modello 1915 naval gun.

The Fiat 18P was suited for use in mountainous terrain. The Fiat 18P had a payload capacity of 2 1/2 tonnes (2.8 short tons) and was powered by a Fiat 53A 4,398 cc (268.4 cu in) 4-cylinder inline petrol engine which produced 40 hp (30 kW) at 1,800 rpm. It had a 3.15 m (10 ft 4 in) wheelbase, and a maximum speed of 22 km/h (14 mph).

== History ==
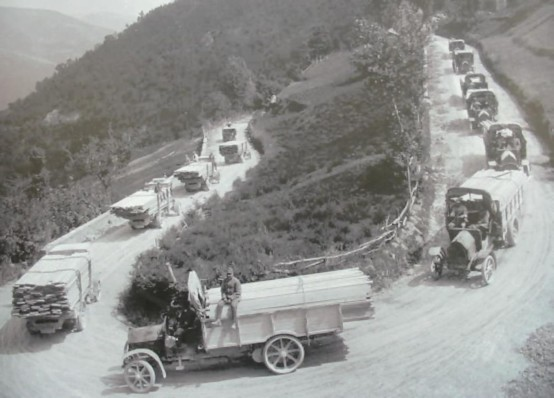
Convoy of Fiat 18BLs during the First World War

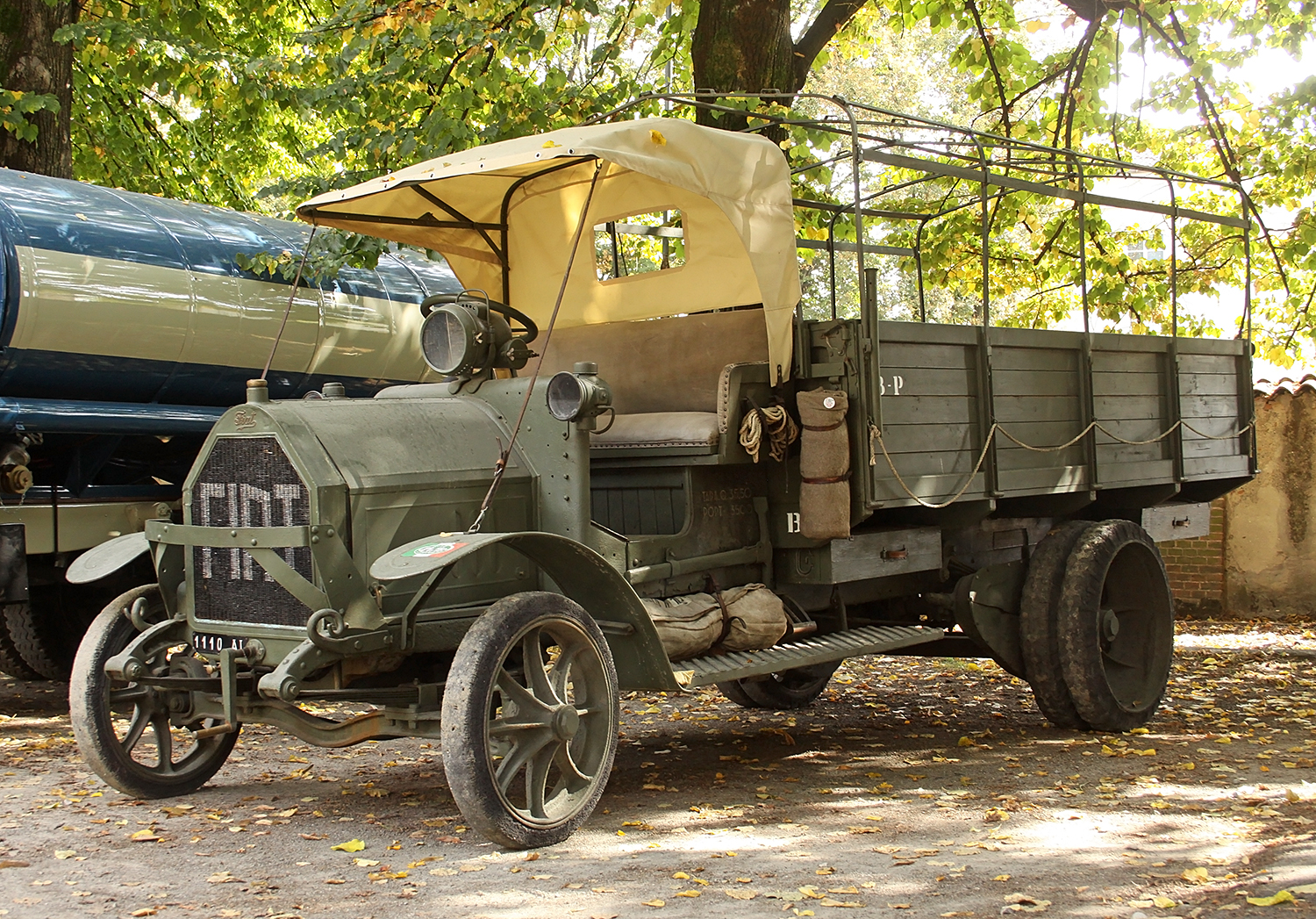
Preserved Fiat 18BLR

The Fiat 18 was designed by engineer Carlo Cavalli who also designed the highly successful Fiat 15, and was produced in large numbers by Fiat throughout the 1910s they were the principal heavy motorised transport of Italian military of the First World War.

The 18A was introduced in 1913, and was produced until 1915 when it was superseded in production by the 18BC, the latter remaining in production until 1919 and was produced as both a truck and a bus. The 18P was derived from both the 18M and the 18BC, it was produced from 1915, by September 1918 3,146 were in service and a further 1,701 were under repair. The 18P remained in Italian Army service post-war, with some still being used for training purposes as late as 1938.

The 18BL was introduced in 1915 in response to a 1914 request from the Italian War Department for a heavy transport. It, along with the 18BLR, was the most numerous heavy transport used by the Italian military during the First World War, and it was also supplied to the British and French Armies fighting in Italy during the war. By September 1918, 5,413 18BLs and 18BLRs were in Italian military service and a further 902 were under repair, with thousands more on order. The 18BL and 18BLR remained in Italian military service post-war, some remaining in service as late as 1938. Some were also supplied to Spanish Nationalists, seeing service in the Spanish Civil War.
