= 3.7 cm ÚV vz. 38 =

3.7cm ÚV vz. 38 (Škoda A7)
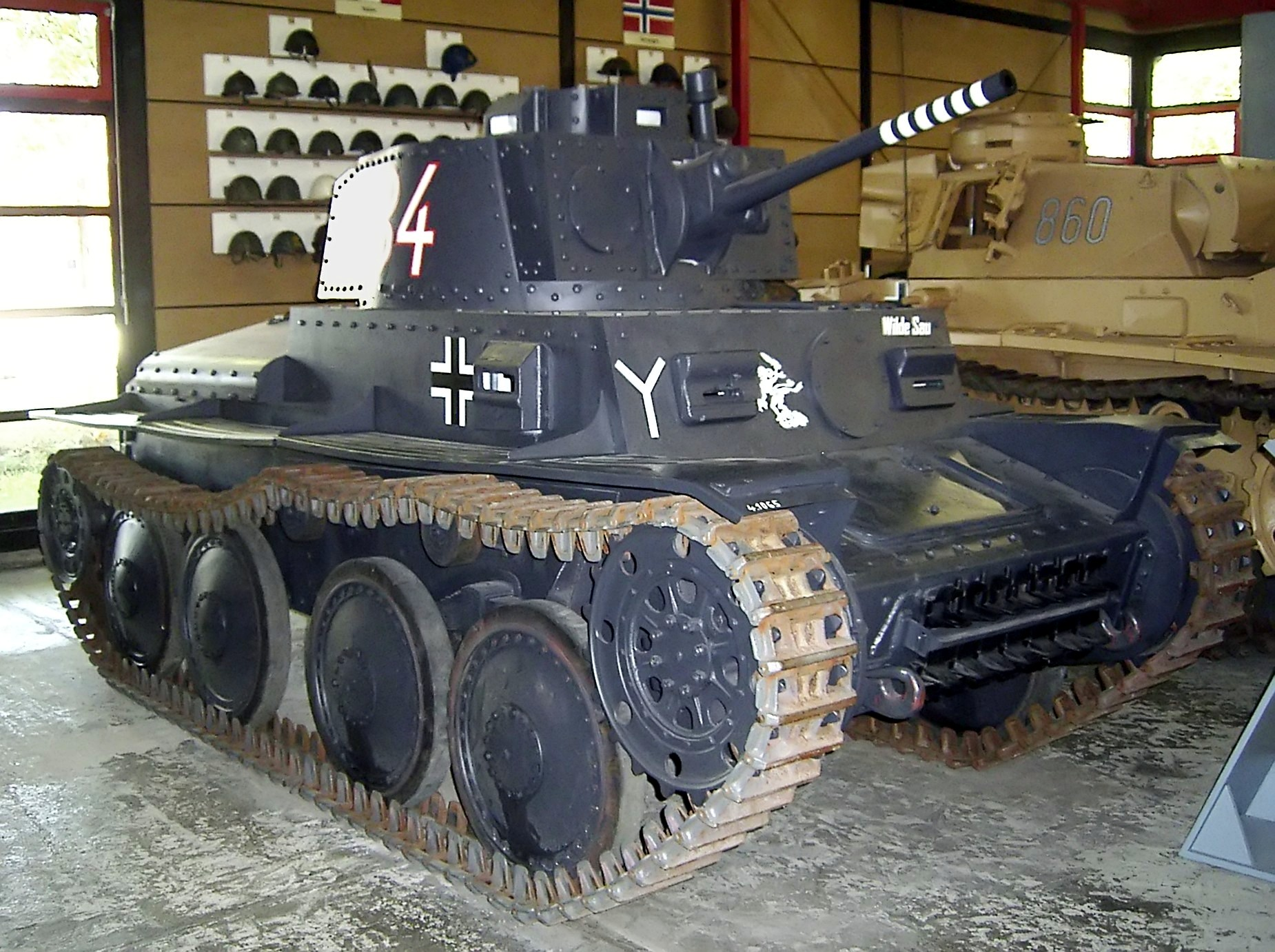
- A Panzer 38(t) in the German Tank Museum, Munster
- Type: Tank gun
- Place of origin: Czechoslovakia

Service history
- In service: 1938 to 1945
- Used by: Czechoslovakia; Nazi Germany; Hungary; Iran; Romania
- Wars: World War II

Specifications
- Mass: 275kg (606 pounds)
- Barrel length: 1.769 m (5 ft 10 in) L/47.8
- Shell: Fixed QF 37 x 268 mm R APCBC, APCR, HE
- Caliber: 37.2 mm (1.46 in)
- Carriage: Turret
- Rate of fire: 15–20 rpm
- Muzzle velocity: 762 m/s (2,500 ft/s)
- Effective firing range: 1,500 m (1,600 yd)

The 3.7 cm ÚV vz. 38 (Czech: útočná vozba), manufacturer's designation Škoda A7, was a 37 mm tank gun designed by the Skoda Works in Czechoslovakia prior to World War II.

The gun was the primary armament of the Czech LT vz. 38 light tank, known in German service as the Panzer 38(t).

The primary user of the A7 was the Wehrmacht during World War II where the weapon went by the name 3.7 cm Kampfwagenkanone 38(t).

== Performance ==
In German service, in addition to conventional high explosive ammunition, the weapon fired two anti-tank rounds. The primary round the Panzergranate Pzgr.(t) umg. armor-piercing capped ballistic cap (APCBC), was ineffective at 2,000 m (2,200 yd) and beyond. The rarer tungsten Panzergranate 40 armor-piercing composite rigid (APCR), was ineffective at 1,000 m (1,100 yd) and beyond.

Armor penetration table
Range	Contact angle 30°
APCBC
100 m (110 yd)	42 mm (1.7 in)
500 m (550 yd)	33 mm (1.3 in)
1,000 m (1,100 yd)	23 mm (0.91 in)
1,500 m (1,600 yd)	17 mm (0.67 in)
APCR
100 m (110 yd)	59 mm (2.3 in)
500 m (550 yd)	36 mm (1.4 in)
1,000 m (1,100 yd)	20 mm (0.79 in)

Calculated penetration (at 90 degrees) using American and British 50% success criteria.
Ammunition type	Muzzle velocity	Penetration				
Ammunition type	Muzzle velocity	100 m	500 m	1000 m	1500 m	2,000 m (6,600 ft)
Pzgr.34 APC	741 m/s	53 mm (2.1 in)	40 mm (1.6 in)	29 mm (1.1 in)	21 mm (0.83 in)	15 mm (0.59 in)
Pzgr. 40 APCR	1,020 m/s	77 mm (3.0 in)	47 mm	26 mm (1.0 in)	14 mm (0.55 in)	8 mm

== See also ==
- Weapons of Czechoslovakia interwar period
- List of World War II artillery
