= Handbuch der Geschichte der böhmischen Länder =

History book by Carl Bosl, 1967 to 1974

- Cover of the first edition (1970)
- Author: Karl Bosl
- Subject: Bohemia history
- Published: 1967—1974 (Hiersemann)

Handbuch der Geschichte der böhmischen Länder (Handbook on the History of Bohemian Lands), is a four-volume book, edited by the German historian Carl Bosl from 1967 to 1974 and covering the history of Bohemia, starting from its ancient history to the middle of the 20th century.
