= 10.5 cm hrubý kanón vz. 35 =

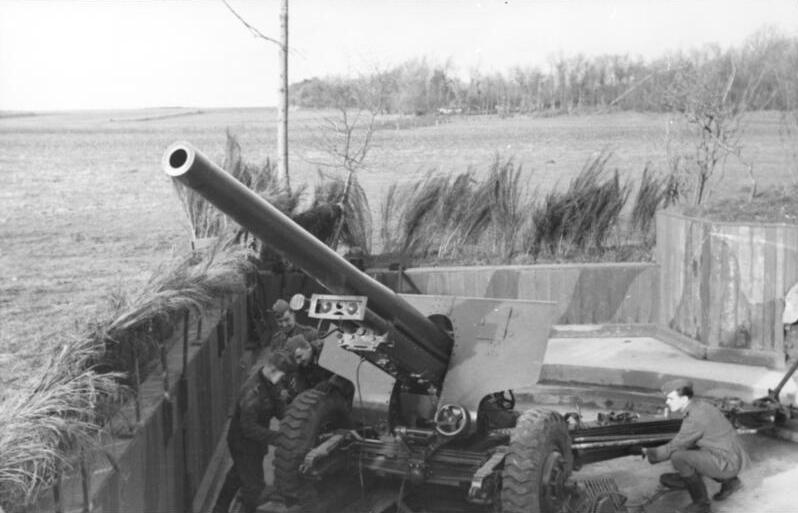
- 10.5 cm hk vz. 35 captured by the Wehrmacht, emplaced as coastal artillery in France
- Type: Medium field gun
- Place of origin: Czechoslovakia

Service history
- In service: 1935–1945
- Wars: World War II

Production history
- Designer: Škoda
- Designed: 1927–1933
- Manufacturer: Škoda
- Produced: 1935–1941
- No. built: 106

Specifications
- Mass: 4,200 kg (9,300 lb)
- Barrel length: 4.4 m (14 ft) L/42
- Crew: 9
- Shell: 108×681mmR
- Shell weight: 18 kg (40 lb)
- Caliber: 108 mm (4.25 in)
- Breech: Sliding block
- Recoil: Hydropneumatic
- Carriage: Split trail
- Elevation: -6° to +42°
- Traverse: 50°
- Rate of fire: 8 rounds/min
- Muzzle velocity: 730 m/s (2,400 ft/s)
- Maximum firing range: 18,100 m (19,800 yd)

The 10.5 cm hrubý kanón vz. 35 (Heavy Gun model 35) was a Czech field gun used in the Second World War.

== History ==
The field gun was developed by the Military Aviation and Technical Institute starting in 1927. Its final form was approved in 1931. In 1933, the Ministry of Defense ordered a prototype which was delivered by Škoda at the end of November 1934. After extensive testing and the resolution of defects, the piece was adopted in 1935 by the army under the designation 10.5 cm hrubý kanón vzor 35.

After the occupation, the guns captured by Germany were put into service by the Wehrmacht under the designation schwere 10.5 cm Kanone 35(t). Furthermore, the production of these modern and efficient weapons continued for the Germans in occupied Czechoslovakia. Additional guns were captured in the Balkans campaign and were given the designation 10.5 cm Kanone 339 (j). These guns were used by a variety of German units during World War II, especially on coastal defense duties.

== Design ==
It was designed solely for motor traction. It fired 18-kilogram (40 lb) HE, canister and semi-armor-piercing shells.

== Operators ==
- Bulgaria
- Czechoslovakia
- Nazi Germany
- Slovakia – 36 guns remaining in 1939 entered service with the Slovak Army.
- Yugoslavia – Supplied by Škoda to the Yugoslav army under the designation 105 mm M.36.
- Lithuania – Ordered 24 pieces, of which only 4 were delivered before the German occupation of Czechoslovakia.

== Gallery ==
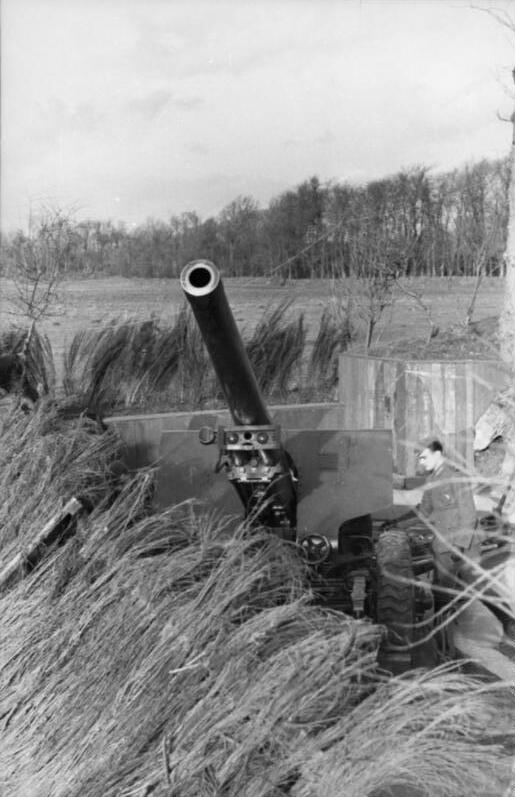

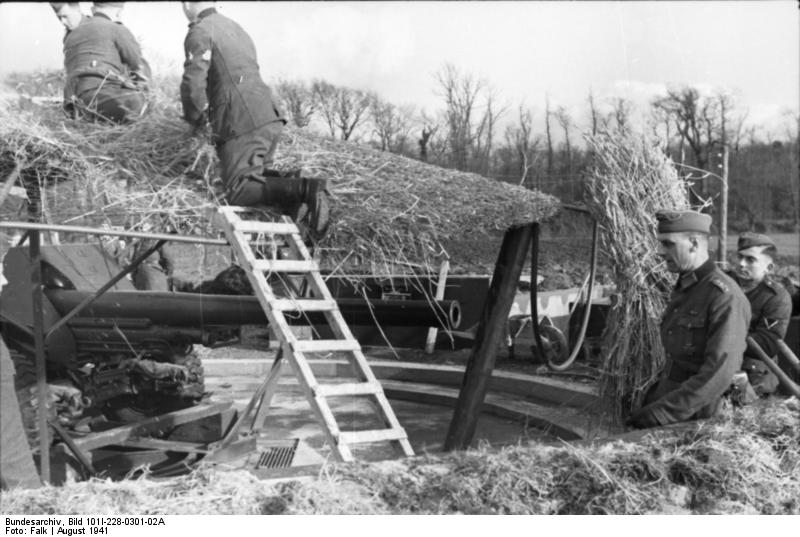

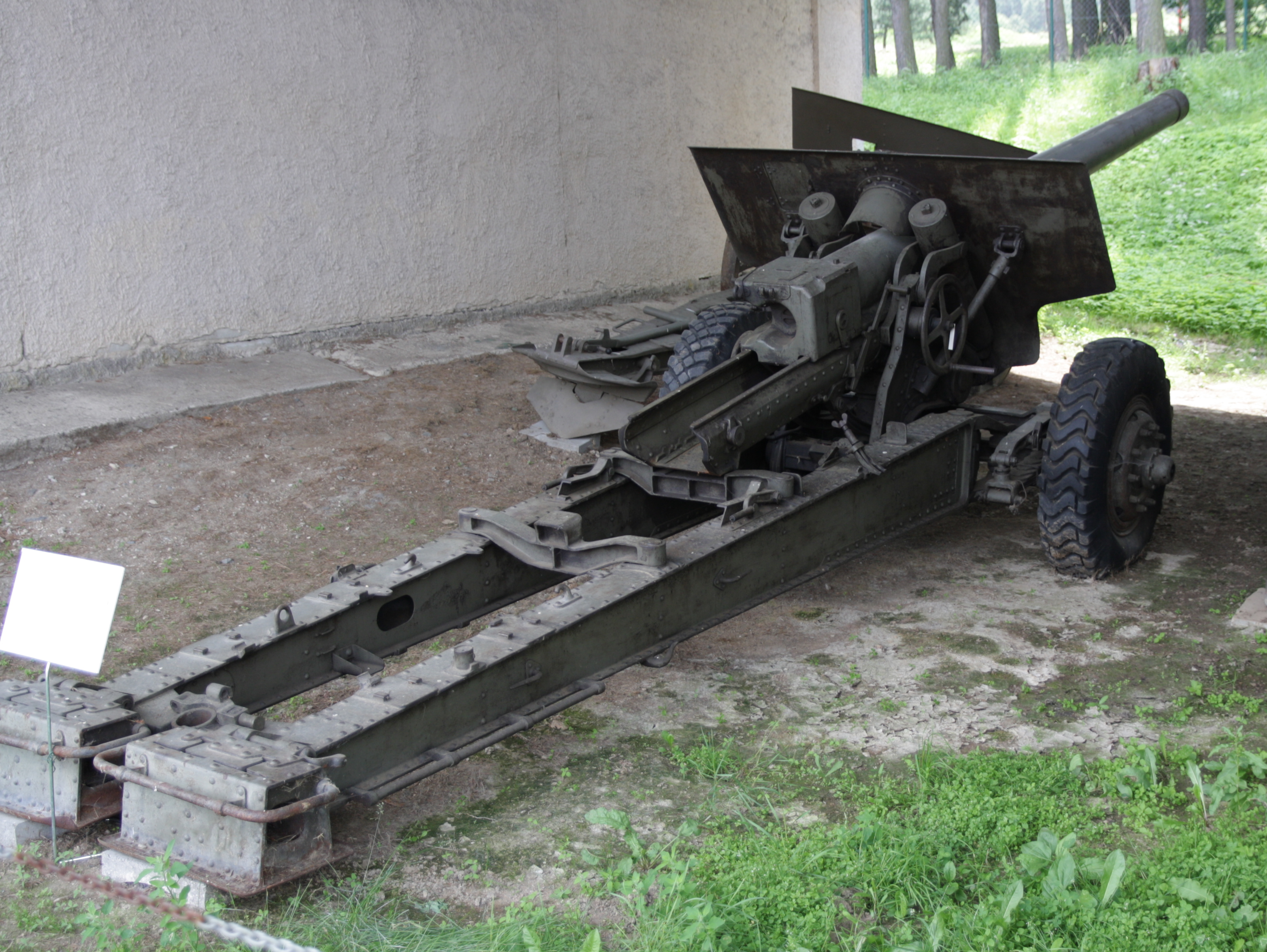
in Military Museum Lešany
