= KP vz. 38 =

Czechoslovak submachine gun developed in the 1930s

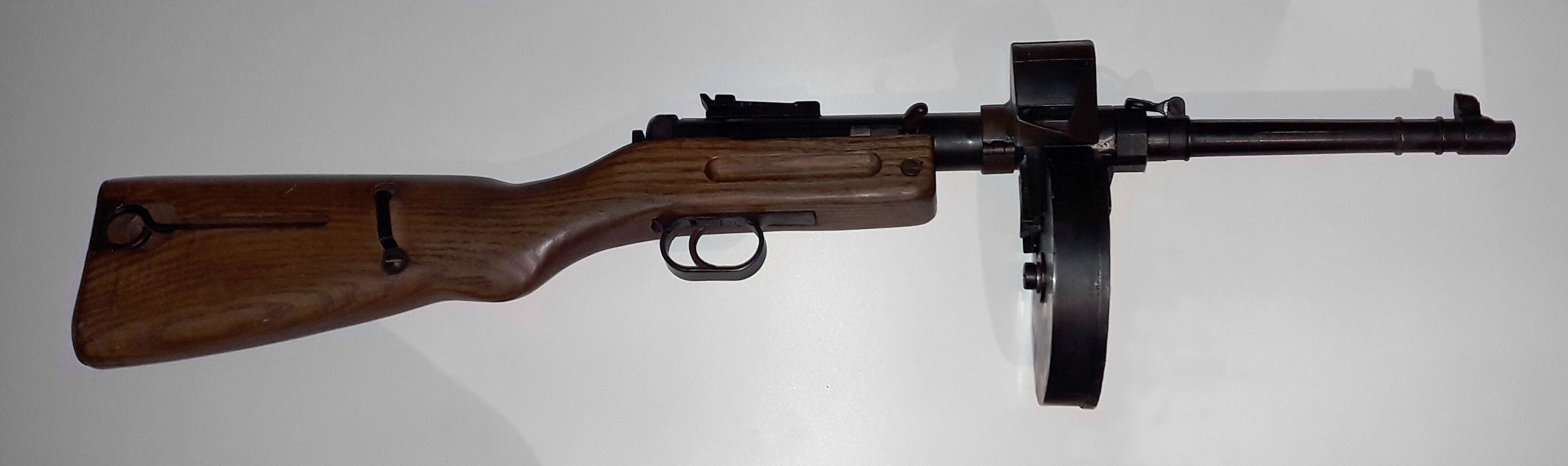
- Replica of vz. 38 SMG with drum magazine
- Type: Submachine gun
- Place of origin: Czechoslovakia

Service history
- In service: 1938

Production history
- Designer: František Myška
- Designed: 1937-1938
- Manufacturer: Česká Zbrojovka Strakonice
- No. built: 15

Specifications
- Mass: 3.2 kg
- Length: 810 mm
- Barrel length: 230 mm
- Cartridge: .380 ACP
- Action: Blowback
- Rate of fire: 500 rounds/min
- Feed system: 36 box magazine or 96 drum magazine

Kulometná pistole vzor 38 (machine gun pistol model 38), also referred to as Samopal vzor 38 (submachine gun model 38), was a Czechoslovak submachine gun developed during the late 1930s by František Myška. The weapon was officially put into service with the Czechoslovak Army with an order of initial 3,500 pieces to be produced. However, due to the Sudeten crisis, the full-scale production of the submachine gun was halted with minuscule numbers being fully completed. None of the completed samples managed to be used by Czechoslovak soldiers.
