= Těšín electoral district (Czechoslovakia) =

Coordinates: 49°44′54.39″N 18°37′59.58″E

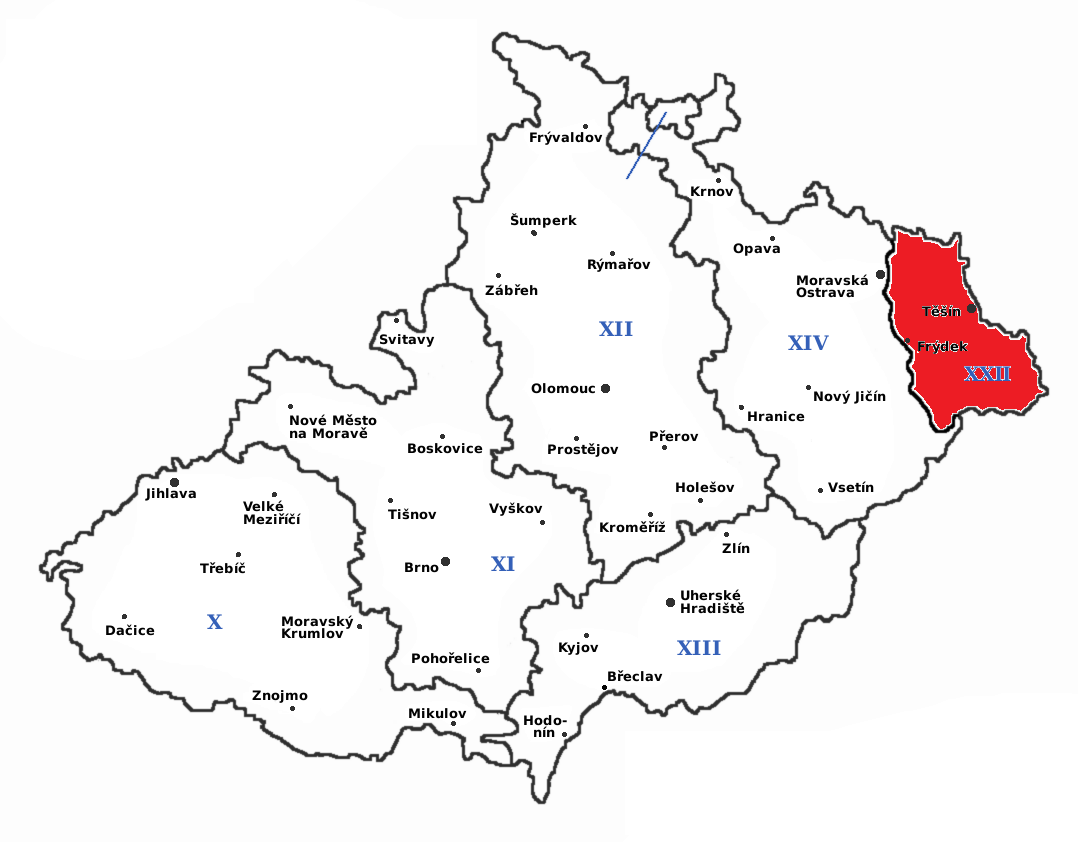
Electoral districts in Moravia-Silesia as per the situation after the Spa Conference of 1920 and before the abolition of the Těšín district in 1925. The Těšín district is highlighted in red.

The Těšín electoral district was a parliamentary constituency in the First Czechoslovak Republic. It was set up ahead of the April 1920 parliamentary election in an area that both Czechoslovakia and Poland claimed as theirs. No vote was held there in 1920 and the constituency was abolished before the 1925 parliamentary election.

== 1920 election ==
The constituency was intended to be used for elections to both the Chamber of Deputies (9 seats) and the Senate (4 seat). For Chamber of Deputies election it was named as the 22nd electoral district ('XXII. Těšín') and for senatorial election it was named as the 12th electoral district ('XII. Těšín'). However voting was not held in the Těšín electoral district in the April 1920 Czechoslovak parliamentary election, leaving the seats assigned to the constituency empty. At the time, Czechoslovak authorities stressed that an election of deputies and senators from the Těšín electoral district would take place at a later stage.

== Bifurcation ==
The area, which had been occupied by Czechoslovak troops in 1919, was the centre of a territorial dispute between Poland and Czechoslovakia following the end of the First World War. The Duchy of Teschen came under the Kingdom of Bohemia in 1327, and the Czech leaders considered it as part historical Czech lands. But the population was predominately Polish, the 1910 census had found that 55% of the Těšín district population was Polish, 27% Czech and 18% German.

As per the 28 July 1920 decision of the Spa Conference the area was divided between Czechoslovakia and Poland. The area awarded to Czechoslovakia covered 1269 km^{2} and some 285,000 inhabitants, the area awarded to Poland constituted 1,013 km^{2}. with some 150,000 inhabitants. The district centre, Těšín, was divided into two by the Olza river.

== 1921 census ==
The 1921 Czechoslovak census estimated that the Těšín electoral district had 309,614 inhabitants. 95.8% of all Czechoslovak citizens of Polish ethnicity lived in the Těšín electoral district.

== Abolition ==
Ahead of the 1925 parliamentary election the 1920 electoral law was amended, resulting in the abolition of the Těšín electoral district. The areas of the erstwhile Těšín district that had remained in Czechoslovakia became part of the Moravská Ostrava electoral district. The 9 Chamber of Deputies seats that had been allocated to Těšín in 1920 were re-allocated to the Prague (3), Brno (1) and Moravská Ostrava (5) electoral districts. One of the Těšín Senate seats was allocated to Prague, the remaining three went to Moravská Ostrava.
