= Škoda Model 1928 gun =

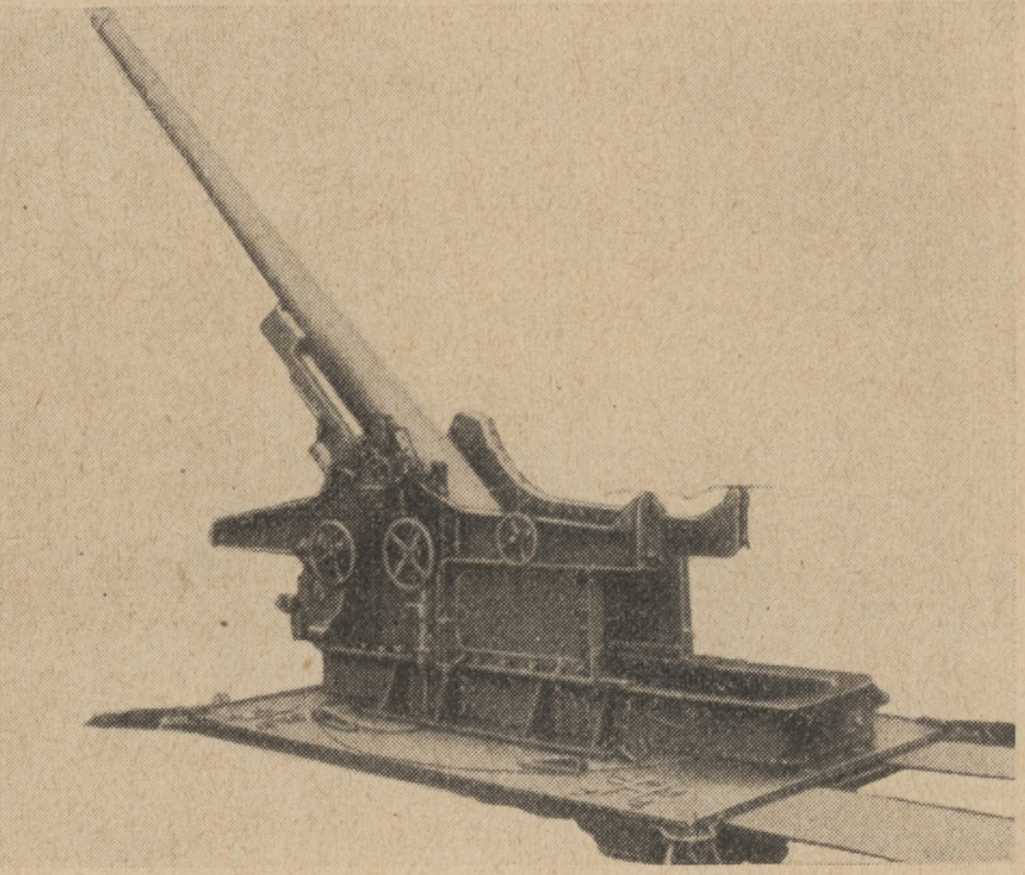
- Type: Heavy gun
- Place of origin: Czechoslovakia

Service history
- In service: 1928–1945
- Used by: Nazi Germany; Romania; Yugoslavia
- Wars: World War II

Production history
- Designer: Škoda
- Manufacturer: Škoda

Specifications
- Mass: 15,000 kilograms (33,000 lb)
- Barrel length: 7.025 metres (20 ft) L/46.5
- Shell: 56 kilograms (123 lb)
- Caliber: 149.1 mm (5.87 in)
- Carriage: Box trail
- Elevation: +4° to +45°
- Traverse: 360°
- Rate of fire: 1 rpm
- Muzzle velocity: 760 m/s (2,493 ft/s)
- Maximum firing range: 23.8 km (14.8 mi)

The Škoda 149 mm Model 1928 gun was a Czechoslovak long-range, dual-purpose cannon designed for the attack of static fortifications and coastal defence duties. About 20 were bought by Yugoslavia and more by Romania. Guns captured by Nazi Germany after the Invasion of Yugoslavia were used by the Heer as the 15 cm Kanone 403(j). It was tested by the Czechs as the 15 cm kanon NO, but was not purchased.

The gun was mounted on a metal firing platform to give it 360° traverse. It was transported in three loads.
