= Tanks of Czechoslovakia =

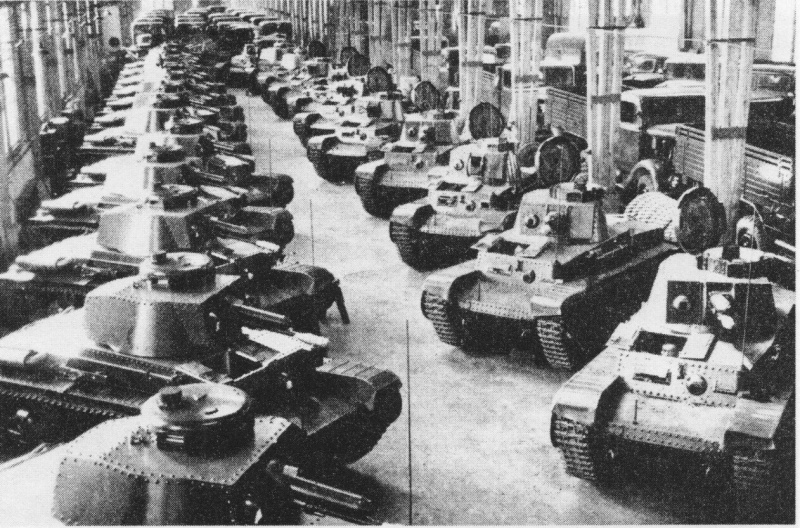
LT vz. 35 tanks in the Škoda Works

This article deals with the history of tanks employed by military forces in Czechoslovakia from the interwar period, and the more conventional tanks designed for the Czechoslovak Army before World War II, and the tanks that ended up as Panzers of the German Wehrmacht during World War II, or in the use of other countries who purchased them before the war began.

== Overview ==
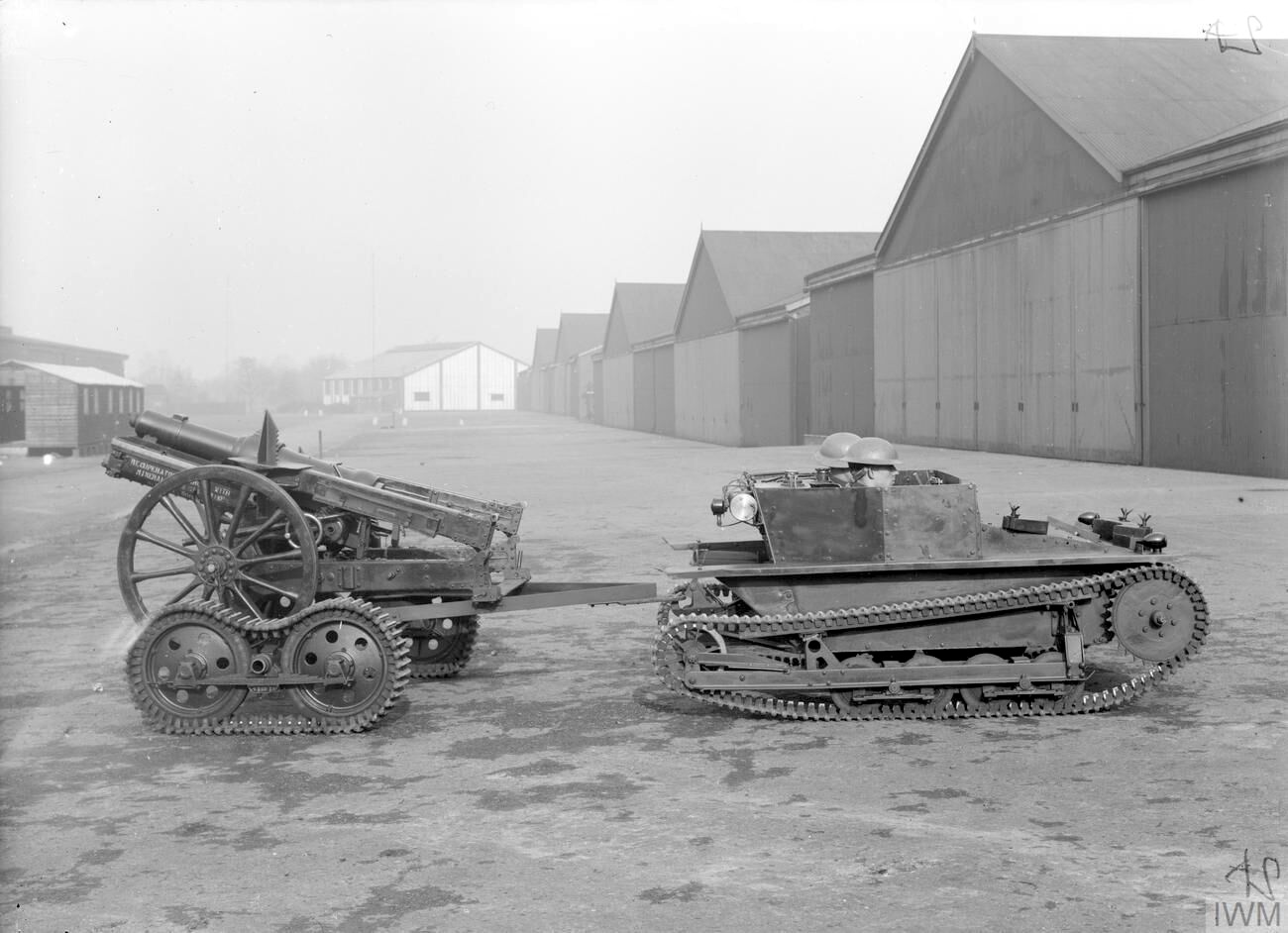
A Carden-Loyd tankette shown towing a howitzer

The first armored tanks and vehicles in Czechoslovakia were like most countries based on others designs and eventually evolved into their own tank designs. The Czechoslovak Army bought three Carden Loyd tankettes and a production license for them in 1930, Českomoravská Kolben-Daněk building four copies that same year as prototypes for future orders. The Carden Loyds were evaluated during the Fall maneuvers and revealed numerous problems: the crews had very poor vision through the narrow slits, the machine gun had a very narrow field of fire, and the crewmen had a difficult time communicating. Furthermore, they were slow, underpowered and often broke down. One of the P-1 prototypes was rebuilt to address these issues with additional vision ports in all directions, internal ammunition storage and the machine gun's field of fire increased to 60°. It was extensively tested during 1931—2 and a few other changes were made as a result. The armor was increased from 6 to 8 mm (0.24 to 0.31 in) and from 9 to 12 mm (0.35 to 0.47 in) and a fixed machine gun was added for the driver. Two of the other prototypes were rebuilt to the same standard; all three were officially accepted by the Army on 17 October 1933. The other prototype was eventually given to the Shah of Iran. The order for seventy was placed on 19 April 1933, all being delivered by October 1934.

== Political developments influencing Czechoslovakia military forces ==
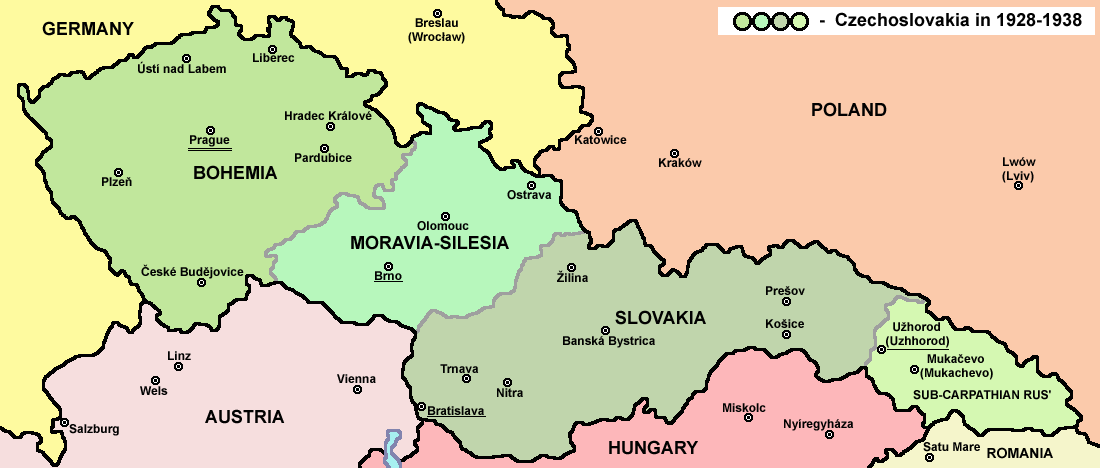
Czechoslovakia in 1928

After the first World War, Slovakia and the regions of Bohemia, Moravia, Silesia and Carpathian Ruthenia formed a common state, Czechoslovakia, with the borders confirmed by the Treaty of Saint Germain and Treaty of Trianon. In 1919, during the chaos following the breakup of Austria-Hungary, Czechoslovakia was formed with numerous Germans and Hungarians within the newly set borders. A Slovak patriot Milan Rastislav Štefánik (1880–1919), who helped organize Czechoslovak regiments against Austria-Hungary during the First World War, died in a plane crash. In the peace following the World War, Czechoslovakia emerged as a sovereign European state. It provided what were at the time rather extensive rights to its minorities and remained the only democracy in this part of Europe in the interwar period.

During the Interwar period, democratic Czechoslovakia was allied with France, and also with Romania and Yugoslavia (Little Entente); however, the Locarno Treaties of 1925 left East European security open. Both Czechs and Slovaks enjoyed a period of relative prosperity. There was progress not only in the development of the country's economy, but also in culture and educational opportunities. The German minority came to accept their role in the new country and relations with Austria were good. Yet the Great Depression caused a sharp economic downturn, followed by political disruption and insecurity in Europe.

Thereafter, Czechoslovakia came under continuous pressure from the revisionist governments of Germany and Hungary. Eventually, this led to the Munich Agreement of September 1938, which allowed Nazi Germany to partially dismember the country by occupying what was called the Sudetenland, a region with a German-speaking majority bordering Germany and Austria. The Germans seized a large amount of the Czechoslovak designed tanks and armored vehicles when they occupied Bohemia-Moravia in March 1939. The remainder of "rump" Czechoslovakia was renamed Czecho-Slovakia and included a greater degree of Slovak political autonomy.

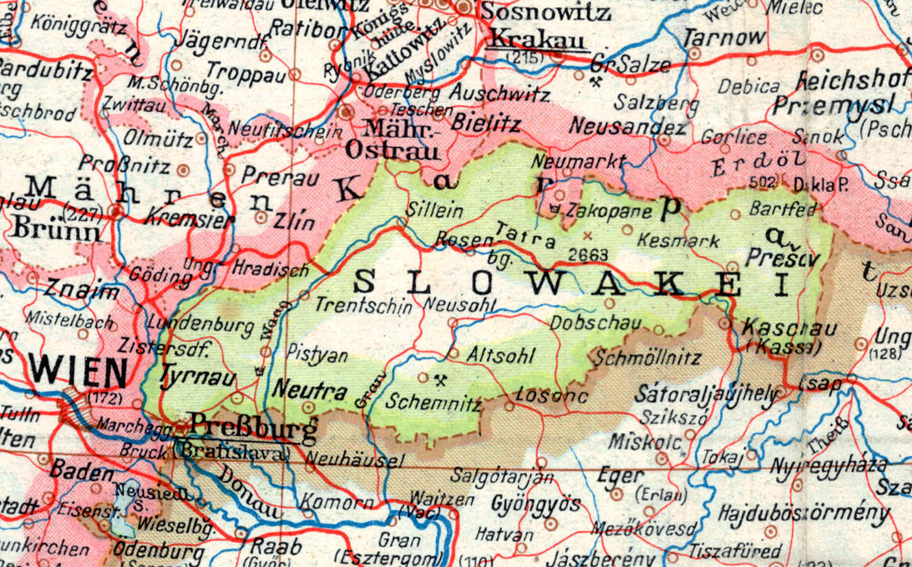
German map of the First Slovak Republic in 1943

After the Munich Agreement and its Vienna Award, Nazi Germany threatened to annex part of Slovakia and allow the remaining regions to be partitioned by Hungary or Poland unless independence was declared. Thus, Slovakia seceded from Czecho-Slovakia in March 1939 and allied itself, as demanded by Germany, with Hitler's coalition. The government of the First Slovak Republic, led by Jozef Tiso and Vojtech Tuka, was strongly influenced by Germany and gradually became a puppet regime in many respects.

After it became clear that the Soviet Red Army was going to push the Nazis out of eastern and central Europe, an anti-Nazi resistance movement launched a fierce armed insurrection, known as the Slovak National Uprising, near the end of summer 1944. A bloody German occupation and a guerilla war followed. The territory of Slovakia was liberated by Soviet and Romanian forces by the end of April 1945.

=== Pre-World War II ===
After World War I, the Polish army began designing tankettes, light tanks, and armored vehicles, many by Škoda. The German engineer Joseph Vollmer joined Škoda and designed a wheel/track light tank, the KH-50 (Kolo-Housenka). This design had roadwheels mounted on the drive sprockets and jockey wheels behind them to support the tracks. During World War I, Vollmer was chief designer for the German War Department's motor vehicle section, and he had designed the World War I German tanks A7V, K-Wagen, LK I and LK II. Despite the design for the KH-50 (Kolo-Housenka) having impressive specifications for the period – 13 mm armour, 37 mm turret-mounted armament, and a 50 hp engine capable of driving the tank at 8 miles per hour (13 km/h) (on tracks) and 22 miles per hour (35 km/h) (on wheels) – it was rejected by the Czechoslovak army.

The army was, however, impressed by the hybrid wheel/track concept and commissioned further studies, which resulted in the KH-60 (1928–29) and the KH-70 (1930). In these two designs the engine power was increased to 60 hp and 70 hp respectively and a better system was developed for switching between track and wheel use which allowed a change in less than 10 minutes.

Two KH-50 prototypes were built, one of which was later converted to a KH-60; the other was scrapped. Actual production included two KH-60s to the USSR and a KH-70 to Italy. The wheel-on-track concept was finally abandoned in 1934. The Škoda T-21 (original designation was Škoda Š-IIc) was Škoda's contribution to the IIc army category (medium tanks for general use) and a direct competitor to the Praga V-8-H.

Basically, what happened: in the early thirties, both Praga and Škoda (main competitors for the Czechoslovak army contracts, but also when it came to export) had several unsuccessful designs when it came to infantry support tanks. While the light tanks (LT-35 and the later LT-38) were generally good, they just couldn't get infantry support right. The unsuccessful attempts where the Praga P-IIb and Škoda Š-IIb. After that, both companies basically sat together and made a joint infantry tank project, designated ŠP-IIb. It was unsuccessful for various reasons, mostly because neither company was that eager to cooperate with their main competitor. Also, both companies worked on their own private attempts to build IIb/IIc category prototypes. These private attempts would later become the Praga V-8-H and the Škoda T-21.

The main design works on the T-21 began as early as September 1936. The first prototype was finished in May 1937 – and so began the long journey of this vehicle and its versions and derivates, that ended only after the war.

The first variant from May 1937 was the original Š-IIc. It was supposed to be fitted with a new engine, built especially for it by the automobile factory branch of Škoda in Mladá Boleslav, but the engine development got delayed and the prototype was (in order to save time) fitted with a 190 hp 13-liter V6, originally intended for the Š-III breakthrough tank prototype. The prototype was also fitted with a mock weaponry (representing a 47 mm gun and two machine guns). But the engine was not powerful enough, overheated and used a lot of fuel. In September 1937, the V6 engine was removed and the original Škoda engine intended for it was installed. However, the vehicle still didn't do too well (the engine actually seized and had to be scrapped) and the tests were stopped in November, marking the end of the first development stage of T-21. By that time, the Ministry of Defence committee was looking for a suitable Czechoslovak medium tank for the army, but the Š-IIc did not to make the June 1938 army tests deadline – and that was the end of the T-21 as a potential Czechoslovak army medium tank. From June to November 1938, the prototype was modified further in Plzeň, thus creating a third (and final) variant of the original Š-IIc design (not counting the further modifications made by the Hungarians when developing the Turán I tank from the T-21 prototype – the 40M Turán I is a Hungarian medium tank developed from the T-21 prototype, with significant improvements, including a better-performing Hungarian 40 mm gun, improved armour, a redesigned turret and hull, and Hungarian 8 mm machine guns instead of the 7.92 mm ones). This third variant had (apart from the fixed engine of the same type the second variant had) better tracks, improved engine cooling, improved oil pump and modified steering mechanism.

However, by that time, the Munich agreement completely changed the Czechoslovak army's priorities and selling the (improved) vehicle to the Czechoslovak army was no longer an option. Therefore, Škoda tred to sell the design abroad. During factory trials, the third prototype performed reasonably well and was basically ready for export.

After the occupation of Czechoslovakia, that was of course no longer possible – not without German consent at least. During the early months of occupation, German delegations did visit the Škoda factory and tests were performed with the Š-IIc prototype, which, at that point, on 22.5.1939, was – to fit the German nomenclature principles – renamed to Škoda T-21 (T = tank, 2 = medium, 1 = 1st variant). The Germans didn't show too much interest in it; they wanted to test it in Kummersdorf, but in the end, the Germans decided to produce an improved version, which was named T-22.

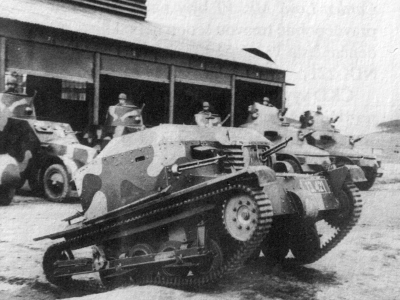
Tančík vz. 33

The British Carden-Lloyd tankettes Czechoslovakia had acquired led to the Czechoslovakia designed tank, the Tančík vz. 33, which was assembled from a framework of steel "angle iron" beams, to which armor plates were riveted. The driver sat on the right side using a 300 mm × 125 mm (11.8 in × 4.9 in) observation port protected by 50 millimetres (2.0 in) of bulletproof glass and an armored shutter which had a 2 mm (0.079 in) slit. The gunner sat on the left and had a similar vision port half the size of the driver's. His ZB vz. 26 machine gun was mounted in a ball mount directly to his front. There were similar vision ports on the sides and the rear. The driver's machine gun was fixed, and he fired it using a Bowden cable; 2,600 rounds were stored for the machine guns.

The front armor was 12 mm (0.47 in) thick, the sides had a thickness of 8 mm (0.31 in), the top was 6 mm (0.24 in) thick, and the bottom plates were 6 mm (0.24 in) in thickness. This was deemed enough to deflect armor-piercing 7.92 mm (0.312 in) bullets fired from distances greater than 125 metres (137 yd) from the front and 185 metres (202 yd) from the sides. Both were supposed to withstand ordinary bullets from over 50 metres (55 yd).

The 1.95 litres (119 cu in), water-cooled, 30 horsepower (22 kW), inline 4-cylinder Praga engine sat directly in the fighting compartment. It had a top speed on the road of 35 kilometres per hour (22 mph). One 50-litre (13 US gal) fuel tank was located to the left of the engine. The transmission had four forward gears and one reverse gear. It, the reduction, differential, driving shafts and brakes were taken from the Praga AN truck. The suspension was a modified version of that used in the Carden-Loyd tankettes. The Tančík vz. 33 (literal translation Tankette model 33) was a Czechoslovak-designed tankette used mainly by Slovakia during World War II. Seventy-four were built. The Germans seized forty when they occupied Bohemia-Moravia in March 1939; there is no record of their use. The Slovaks captured 30 at the same time when they declared independence from Czechoslovakia. In Slovak service, it only saw combat during the Slovak National Uprising.

The AH-IV was another Czechoslovak-designed tankette. With this design, Českomoravská Kolben-Daněk was determined not to repeat the problems of its earlier Tančík vz. 33 tankette and gave the gunner a turret for better observation and all-around fields of fire. It was assembled from a framework of steel "angle iron" beams, to which armor plates between 12 and 6 mm (0.47 and 0.24 in) thick were riveted. The driver sat on the right side using an observation port protected by bulletproof glass and an armored shutter. To his right was a small vision slit. Also to his right, in all models except the Swedish Strv m/37, was a light Zbrojovka Brno ZB vz. 26 or vz. 30 machine gun that was usually locked in place and fired using a Bowden cable. The gunner sat on the left and manned a small turret fitted with a ZB vz. 35 or ZB vz. 37 heavy machine gun in a ball mount. Most of the machine gun's barrel protruded from the mount and was protected by an armored trough. He had a large vision port to the right of the machine gun mount in the turret and a small vision slit on the left side of the superstructure. 3700 rounds were carried for the two machine guns. No radio was fitted.

The 3.468 litres (211.6 cu in), water-cooled, six-cylinder Praga engine produced 55 horsepower (41 kW) at 2500 rpm. It sat in the rear of the fighting compartment and drove the transmission via a drive shaft that ran forward between the driver and commander to the gearbox. Cooling air was designed to draw air in through the commander's and driver's hatches. This had the advantage of rapidly dispersing gun combustion gases when firing, but several disadvantages. The constant draft generated by the engine greatly affected the crew during cold weather, and the engine noise and heat increased crew fatigue. It had a top speed on the road of 45 kilometres per hour (28 mph) and a range between 150 and 170 kilometres (93 and 106 mi). The semi-automatic Praga-Wilson transmission had five forward gears and one reverse gear to drive the forward-mounted drive sprocket. The suspension was a smaller version of that used in the Panzerkampfwagen 38(t). It consisted of four large road wheels per side, each pair mounted on a wheel carrier and sprung by leaf springs. There were two-wheel carriers per side. The idler wheel was at the rear and one return roller was fitted. It had a ground pressure of only 0.5 kg/cm^{2}. It could cross a ditch 1.5 metres (4.9 ft) wide, climb an obstacle .5 to .6 metres (1.6 to 2.0 ft) high and ford a stream .8 metres (2.6 ft) deep.

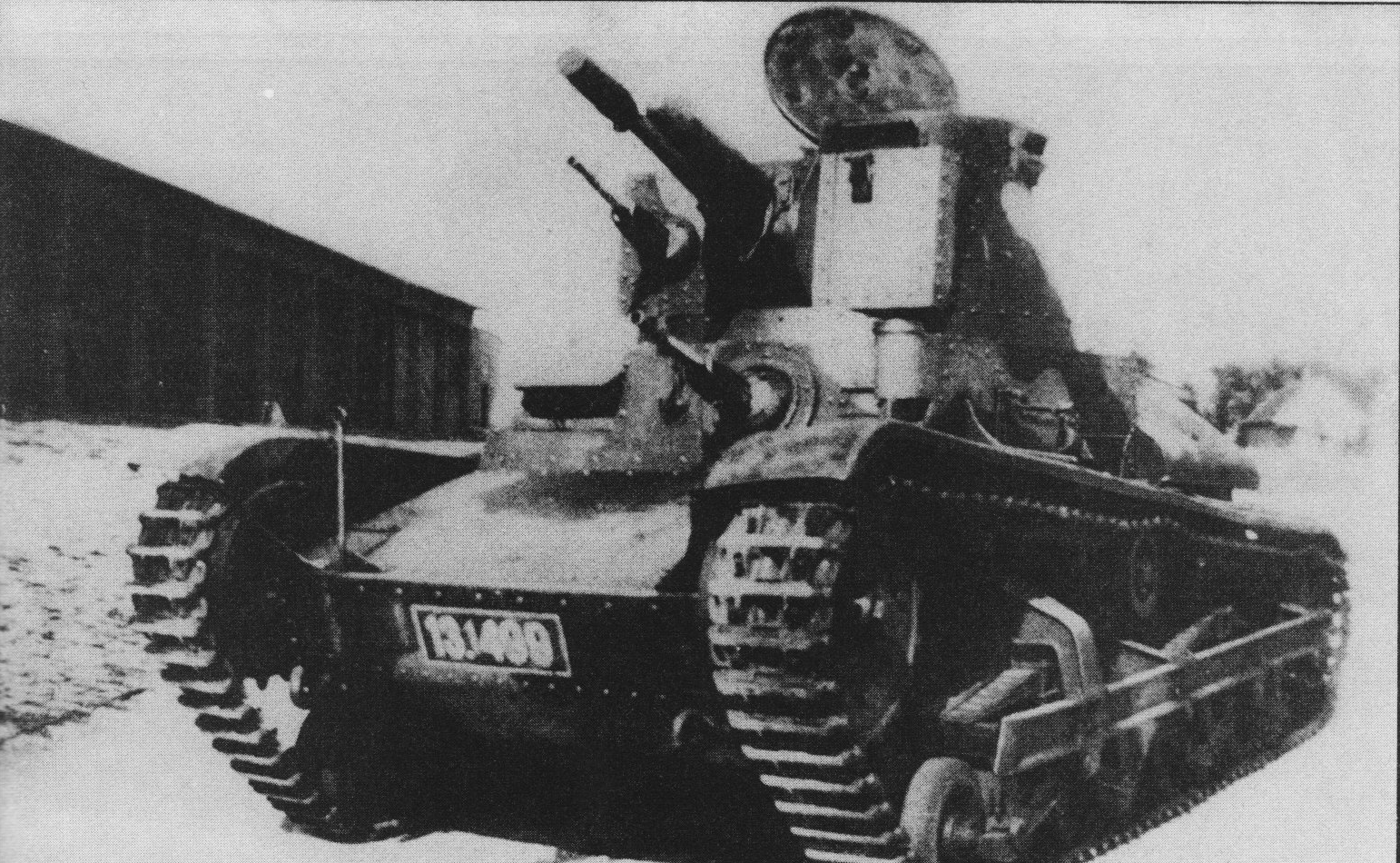
Czechoslovak LT vz. 34 tank

The next major tank development in Czechoslovak service had the formal designation Lehký (Light) Tank vzor (Model) 35 but was commonly referred to as the LT vz. 35 or LT-35. In German use, it was called the Panzerkampfwagen 35(t), commonly shortened to Panzer 35(t) or abbreviated as Pz.Kpfw. 35(t), and this Czechoslovak-designed light tank ended up being used mainly by Nazi Germany during World War II. The letter (t) stood for tschechisch (German: "Czech"). Four hundred and thirty-four were built; of these the Germans seized two hundred and forty-four when they occupied Bohemia-Moravia in March 1939 and the Slovaks acquired fifty-two when they declared independence from Czechoslovakia at the same time. Others were exported to Bulgaria and Romania. In German service it saw combat during the early years of World War II, notably the Invasion of Poland, the Battle of France and the invasion of the Soviet Union before being retired by 1942.

The Panzerkampfwagen 38(t) was another Czech tank of pre-World War II design. After Czechoslovakia was taken over by Germany, it was adopted by the German Army, seeing service in the invasions of Poland, France and Russia. Production ended in 1942, when its armament was deemed inadequate. It was a conventional pre-World War II tank design, with riveted armour and a rear engine. The riveted armour was mostly unsloped, and varied in thickness from 10 mm to 25 mm in most versions. Later models (Ausf. E on) increased this to 50 mm by bolting on an additional 25 mm armour to the front. Side armours received additional 15 mm armour from Ausf. E onward.

The two-man turret was centrally located, and housed the tank's main armament, a 37 mm Skoda A7 gun with 90 rounds stored on board. It was equipped with a 7.92 mm machine gun to the right of the main ordnance. This turret machine gun was in a separate ball mount rather than a fixed coaxial mount. This meant the machine gun could be trained on targets independently. Alternatively, the commander/gunner could couple the machine gun internally to the main gun and use it as a coaxial machine gun. In all, over 1,400 were manufactured. The chassis continued to be produced for Marder III (1942-1944) and Hetzer (1944-1945) tank destroyers, turretless assault guns, anti-tank guns and anti-aircraft guns.

== Development ==
The Tančík vz. 33 (literal translation Tankette model 33) was the first Czechoslovak-designed tankette of which seventy-four were built but it had many issues. The Czechoslovak Army bought three Carden-Loyd tankettes and a production license for them in 1930, Českomoravská Kolben-Daněk building four copies that same year as prototypes for future orders. The Carden-Loyds were evaluated during the Fall maneuvers and revealed numerous problems: the crews had very poor vision through the narrow slits, the machine gun had a very narrow field of fire, and the crewmen had a difficult time communicating. Furthermore, they were slow, underpowered and often broke down. One of the P-1 prototypes was rebuilt to address these issues with additional vision ports in all directions, internal ammunition storage and the machine gun's field of fire increased to 60°. It was extensively tested during 1931—2 and a few other changes were made as a result. The armor was increased from 6 to 8 mm (0.24 to 0.31 in) and from 9 to 12 mm (0.35 to 0.47 in) and a fixed machine gun was added for the driver. Two of the other prototypes were rebuilt to the same standard; all three were officially accepted by the Army on 17 October 1933. The other prototype was eventually given to the Shah of Iran. The order for seventy was placed on 19 April 1933, all being delivered by October 1934.Českomoravská Kolben-Daněk was determined not to repeat the problems of its earlier Tančík vz. 33 tankette for its new AH-IV tankette. The AH-IV tankette d appeared in 1936 and ČKD made improvements which gave the gunner a turret for better observation and all-around fields of fire. Agile and fast, the machine gun-armed combat tankette ended up in others hands as it was built mainly for export.

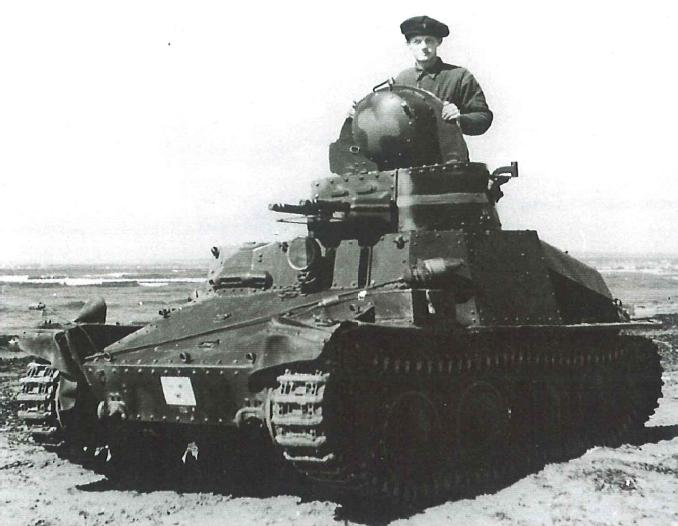
The Swedish model of the AH-IV, the Strv m/37

The LT vz. 34, formally designated as Lehký Tank vzor 34 ("Light Tank Model 34") Czechoslovak-designed light tank had been based on the three Carden-Loyd tankette's, purchased in 1930. Dissatisfied with the prototypes of the Tančík vz. 33 tankette, the Czechoslovak Army decided that it would be easier to design a light tank from scratch rather than modify a tankette's chassis to carry a fully rotating armored turret. 50 of the LT vz. 34 were built, the last of which was delivered during 1936.

One prototype was ordered from Českomoravská Kolben-Daněk in 1931, but development was slow, and it was accepted only in November 1932. Its evaluations were very positive and an order for fifty was placed on 19 April 1933. The first six of these were to serve as pre-production models and were to be delivered by 30 September 1933. The delivery date for the next batch of twenty-four was a year after that and the final batch of twenty was due by 30 July 1935. Production was delayed by quality problems with the initial batch of armor plates from Poldi and delivery of the pre-production series did not occur until 23 April 1934. A bigger problem was that the Army had rejected ČKD's proposed armament of a 4.7 centimetres (1.9 in) Vickers 44/60 gun and two ZB vz. 26 machine guns so the contract was signed with no design work on the desired armament configuration. ČKD did not finalize its design until December 1933 and the first six tanks were delivered with only a pair of ZB vz. 26 machine guns. The last tanks were delivered on 14 January 1936, but the six pre-production models had to be returned to the factory to be upgraded with the proper armament and otherwise modified up to the latest standards. The last one was delivered on 17 August 1936.

The Czechoslovak Army formulated a requirement in the II-a category of light cavalry tanks by the end of 1934. Českomoravská Kolben-Daněk proposed an improved version of its P-II light tank already in service as the LT vz. 34, but Škoda offered a new design that used the pneumatic system and engine earlier proved by its unsuccessful SU or S-II light tank prototype. One prototype was ordered from each company for delivery during the summer of 1935. Both tanks had the same armament and three-man crew, but ČKD's P-II-a was much smaller at 8.5 tonnes (8.4 long tons; 9.4 short tons) and had only a maximum 16 millimetres (0.63 in) of armor while Škoda's S-II-a weighed 10.5 tonnes (10.3 long tons; 11.6 short tons) and had 25 millimetres (0.98 in) of armor. The army thought that P-II-a was at the limit of its development while the S-II-a could be improved as needed.

The first production order for 160 LT vz. 35s, as the S-II-a was designated in Army service, was placed on 30 October 1935 and deliveries began in December 1936. An additional order for 35 was made on 12 May 1936 and a follow-on order placed for 103 more a month later. The total order for 298 tanks was split equally by Škoda Works and ČKD according to their cartel agreement.

Development was rushed and there were many defects in the LT vz. 35s. Many tanks had to be returned to the factories to be repaired. Curiously, most of these repairs involved the electrical system, not the complicated pneumatic system. Britain's Alvis-Staussler negotiated for a production license from September 1938 until March 1939 when the Nazi occupation made an agreement impossible. The Soviets were also interested so Škoda shipped the S-II-a prototype and one production LT vz. 35 to the proving grounds at Kubinka for evaluation. The Soviets were only interested in buying the prototype, but Škoda refused to sell unless a license was purchased as well, believing that the Soviets would simply copy the design and build it without paying any royalties.

By 1935, the Czechoslovak tank manufacturer ČKD was looking for a replacement for the LT vz. 35 or as it came to be known the LT-35 tank, which they were jointly producing with Škoda Works. The LT-35 was complex and had shortcomings, and ČKD felt there would be orders both from the expanding Czechoslovak army and for export.

ČKD decided to use a suspension with four large wheels for their new tank. It resembled the Christie suspension outwardly but was actually a conventional leaf spring unit. The resulting vehicle was reliable, and an export success: 50 were exported to Iran, 24 each to Peru and Switzerland. Lithuania also ordered some. The British Royal Armoured Corps (RAC) had one trial model delivered on 23 March 1939 to the Gunnery School at Lulworth. A report stated, the "(bow) gunner could not sit back comfortably as the wireless set was in the way of his left shoulder." The report also stated that due to the shudder while the vehicle was on the move, it was impossible to lay the gun. Even at the speed of 5 mph, accuracy was poor. As a result, the RAC did not purchase the tank and the trial model was returned.

On 1 July 1938, Czechoslovakia ordered 150 of the TNHPS model, which came to be known as the LT vz. 38. Although none had entered service by the time of the German occupation, those made were taken over and used by Germany. After the German takeover, Germany ordered continued production of the model, as it was considered an excellent tank, especially compared to the Panzer I and Panzer II tanks that were the Panzerwaffe's main tanks. It was first introduced into German service under the name LTM 38; this was changed on 16 January 1940 to Panzerkampfwagen 38(t) and came to be known as the Panzer 38(t). Production of tanks for Germany continued into 1942 and amounted to more than 1,400 examples. Examples were also sold to a number of German allies, including Hungary (102), Slovakia (69), Romania (50), and Bulgaria (10). In German service the 38(t) was used as a substitute for the Panzer III.

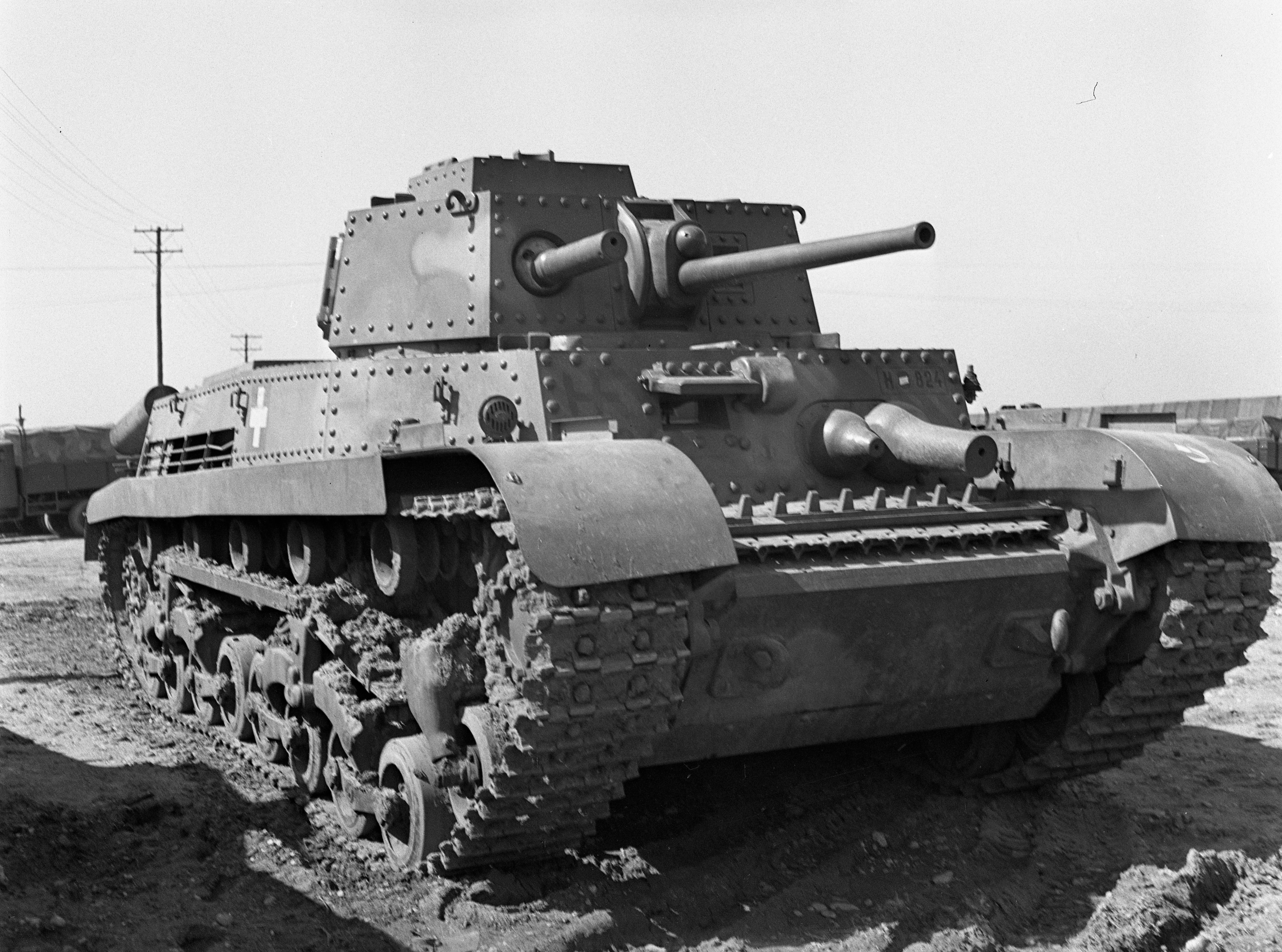
The Hungarian 40M Turán I was based on the design of the Škoda T-21 medium tank prototype, although the two designs were still distinctly different.

In December 1937, the Škoda workshops prepared a prototype of a medium tank based on the LT vz. 35 project. Two prototypes were started and designated S-IIc, but their construction was never finished. The tank weighed 16.5 tonnes (16.2 long tons; 18.2 short tons), was armed with a 47 mm Škoda A9 vz. 38 gun, two 7.92 mm machine guns and its maximum armour was extended to 30 mm. Finally, the S-II-c was to have a better 13.8 liters engine giving 250 hp; this increased the maximum speed to roughly 50 km/h. After Germany annexed Czechoslovakia, the prototypes were finished, and Hungarian engineers developed the 40M Turán I from it. The Turán I had better armour than the S-II-c, also, the Czech 47 mm gun was replaced by a Hungarian 40 mm gun with higher armour penetration, the hull and turret were redesigned, and the 7.92 mm machine guns were changed to Hungarian 8 mm Gebauer machine guns, among other changes differentiating the two tanks. The Hungarian Turán I would see service fighting against the USSR during World War II.

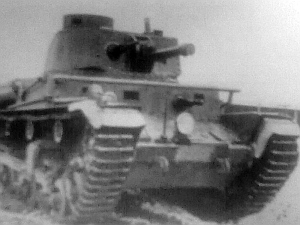
ST vz 39 tank prototype

In the fall of 1937, the Czechoslovak armed forces launched a contest for new medium tank; Škoda, ČKD and Tatra competed. Most interesting was a tank ČKD V-8-H (later ST vz. 39). The V-8-H was the first completely independent construction of ČKD Praga. It was the result of the experience, gained by ČKD during the Šp-IIb cooperation in the mid-1930s (a prototype of Šp-IIb was built in 1937). Škoda, however, being the main competitor of ČKD wasn't really that much interested in cooperation and pushed its resources into what would become the T-2X line of vehicles (specifically the T-21 medium tank). The result was the V-8-H (the designation means V-8 engine, H - tracked) and it did inherit the best parts and experience of the Šp-IIb. Unfortunately, it did inherit some of its flaws too (namely an unreliable engine and weak final drive).

The prototype was built and tested from summer 1937 for roughly six months. The tests went rather fine and subsequently the project was offered to several countries, including the United Kingdom, China, Denmark, Egypt and many others. However, the interest in the vehicle wasn't high as its weight was 14 tons, while most bridges of that time could only hold vehicles up to 10 tons. It was also considerably more expensive than the Czechoslovakia-produced light tanks. Only Italy, Sweden and Switzerland showed some sign of interest. However, in late 1937, the Czechoslovak army decided to run official tank trials both in infantry tank and cruiser tank categories. V-8-H took part in these trials and emerged as the clear victor of its category combined with the army's need for a medium tank. The Czechoslovak army, seeing Germany's new Panzer III vehicles, felt that the contemporary light tanks could not stand up to it. A competition was announced for the new Czechoslovak army medium tank and V-8-H took part. In April 1938, the vehicle was thoroughly tested, and changes were made, leading to the tank's weight increasing by two tons. Almost all the parts were changed and improved, including the engine, armor and drivetrain.

Due to the worsening international situation, the army decided to order 300 V-8-H/ST vz. 39 tanks. An order for a further 150 was canceled after the Munich Agreement of 1938 gave the Sudetenland area of Czechoslovakia to Germany. After the occupation of the remainder of Czechoslovakia on 15 March 1939, representatives of the German armaments office selected the V-8-H for testing by the Army at Eisenach. As a result of a fortnight's testing, an order was issued in November 1939 for the production of another prototype. Both prototypes survived the war but were scrapped soon afterwards.

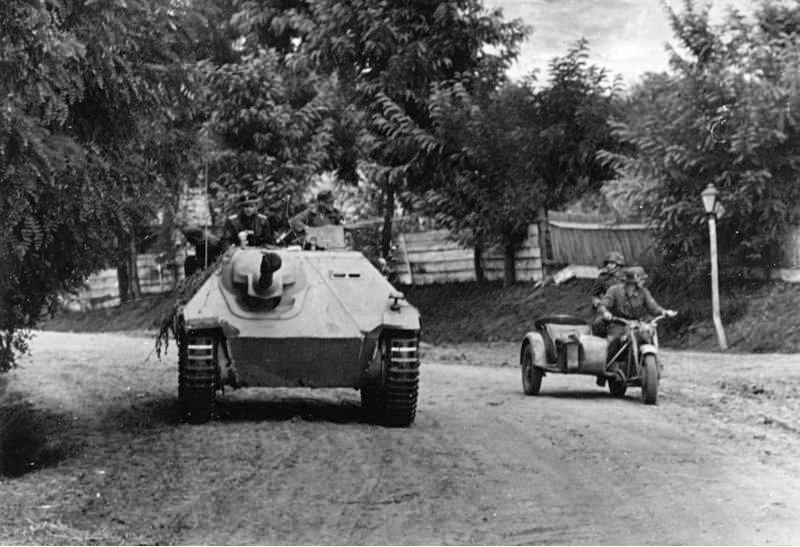
Jagdpanzer 38(t)

The main advantages of the Panzer 38(t), compared to other tanks of the day, were its very high reliability and sustained mobility. In one documented case, a regiment was supplied with tanks driven straight from the factory in 2.5 days instead of the anticipated week, without any mechanical breakdowns (in: History of the 25 Panzer Regiment of the 7 Panzerdivision). In the opinion of the crews, the drive components of the 38(t), engine, gear, steering, suspension, wheels and tracks were perfectly in tune with each other. The 38(t) was also considered to be very easy to maintain and repair.

The Panzer 38(t) was manufactured until June 1942. The small turret was incapable of taking a weapon big enough to destroy late-war tanks, such as the T-34, and manufacturing of the tank version ceased. However, the chassis were used for Marder III tank destroyer from 1942 to 1944. About 1500 Marder III models were produced, which is more than 1400 Panzer 38(t) produced. After Marder III, Jagdpanzer 38(t) was produced based on altered Panzer 38(t) chassis with approximately 2800 produced. Chassis for Panzer 38(t) was the basis for small number of anti-aircraft guns as well.

== Operational history ==
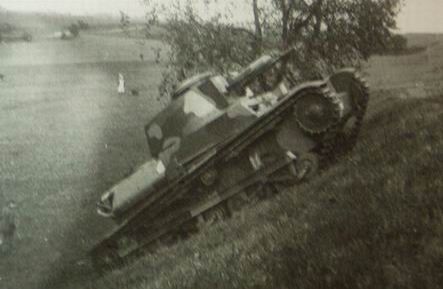
A Czech LT vz. 34 in 1935

The Czechoslovak Army realized that the 15 mm (0.59 in) armor on its LT vz. 34 or P-II light tank was too thin and a program to replace it was quickly mounted, which resulted in the LT vz. 35. In the meantime, they offered the Army an opportunity to train with more modern tanks than its few surviving World War I-era Renault FTs. Each of the three armored regiments received between nine and twenty-four until replaced by the LT vz. 35 from 1937. After the Munich Agreement in October 1938, the army tried to sell them, but could find no takers. In November 1938, it decided to concentrate all of them in the Third Armored Regiment in Slovakia, but only 18 had been transferred before the German occupation of Czechoslovakia and the Slovak declaration of independence in March 1939.

The Germans captured twenty-three LT vz. 34s and the prototype when they occupied Czechoslovakia, but there is no record of their use, so they were presumably quickly scrapped. Ten LT vz. 34s were captured after they were abandoned by the insurgents during the Slovak National Uprising in 1944. They were shipped to Skoda for repairs, but the local military representative ordered them scrapped because of their poor condition and obsolescence. The Waffen-SS tried to overturn this order as it planned to transfer them to Nazi puppet state of Croatia. Two were saved from the scrapyard, but by March 1945 the others had their turrets salvaged to be rearmed with two machine guns and mounted in fixed fortifications.

In Slovakia, 27 LT vz. 34s formed one company in the Armored Battalion "Martin" formed by the Slovak Army in mid-1939, which was later expanded into the Armored Regiment, but they were relegated to training duties once the Slovaks began to receive more modern tanks from Germany in 1941. Ten were abandoned by the insurgents when the Slovak National Uprising began in September 1944 and were quickly captured by the Germans. The others were dug in on the approaches to Zvolen.

The 298 LT vz. 35 commonly known later as the Panzer 35(t) tanks were assigned to the armored regiments belonging to the four Mobile (Rychlá) Divisions between 1936 and 1939. Each regiment was supposed to detach three-tank platoons to support the infantry divisions and border areas in times of crisis. These platoons were heavily used suppressing the protests and violence instigated by Konrad Henlein's Sudeten German Party (Sudetendeutsche Partei - SdP) and the Sudetendeutsche Freikorps (paramilitary groups trained in Germany by SS-instructors) between May and October 1938.

After the Munich Agreement, two tank battalions were sent to reinforce the 3rd Mobile Division in Slovakia. They were used to repel Hungarian and Polish border-crossers, sometimes up to a battalion in strength. They screened the infantry when they had to evacuate southern Slovakia after the First Vienna Award on 2 November 1938. The LT vz. 35 light tanks also were used in the Slovak–Hungarian War or Little War (Hungarian: Kis háború, Slovak: Malá vojna), fought from 23 March to 31 March/4 April 1939 between the First Slovak Republic and Hungary in eastern Slovakia.

A company of nine LT vz. 35s was in Michalovce when Carpatho-Ukraine declared independence and Hungary invaded on 14 March 1939. They bolstered the Czechoslovak defenses in front of Svaliava before being forced to retreat into Slovakia by 17 March. They were turned over to Slovakia the next day. The S-II-a prototype and one LT vz. 35 tank were returning from testing in the Soviet Union when the fighting began. They detrained in Sevljus and participated in a counterattack at Fančíkovo, but the LT vz. 35 was damaged and captured by the Hungarians. The prototype was forced to retreat into Romania by 17 March, along with most of the other Czechoslovak troops in eastern Ruthenia. The Romanians returned it to Škoda six months later.

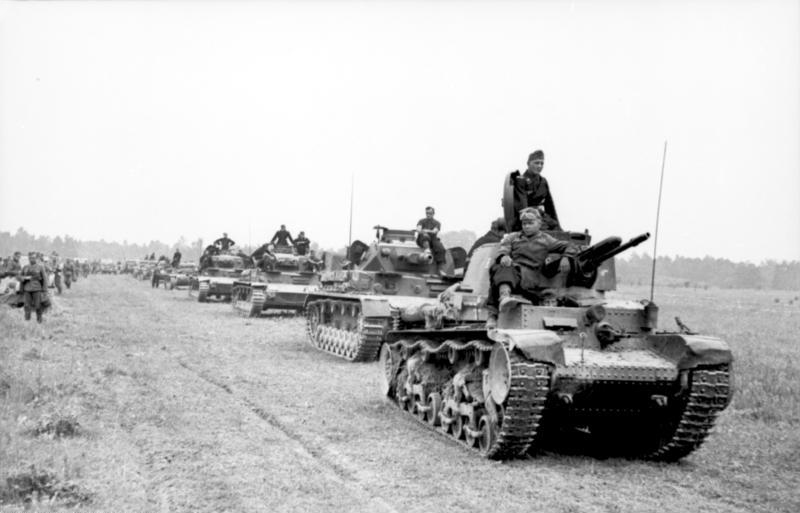
Panzer 35(t) in France, 1940

In 1939, following the German occupation of Czechoslovakia in March 1939, 244 L.T.M.35 of the Czechoslovak Army were seized by the Germans where they were known as the L.T.M.35 until January 1940 then designated Panzer 35(t). In German service, they were used as substitutes for the Panzerkampfwagen III medium tank. They were assigned to the Panzer Battalion (Panzerabteilung) 65 (39) of the 1st Light (leichte) Division and the independent Panzer-Regiment 11 (81) where they participated in the Invasion of Poland. 77 of these were lost during the campaign, mostly due to mechanical breakdowns, but only 7 of these were irreparable. From 1940 on there had not been any spare parts available and tanks had to be completely rebuilt to remain operational.

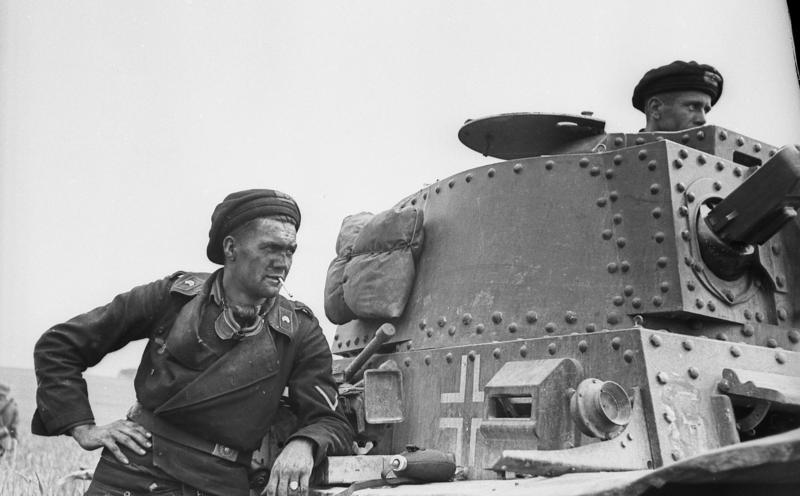
Panzer 38(t), France, June 1940

The LT vz. 38 which was designated by the Germans as the Panzer 38(t) performed well in the Polish Campaign in 1939 and the Battle of France in 1940. It was better armed than the Panzer I and Panzer II tanks. It was on par with most light tank designs of the era, although it was unable to effectively engage the frontal armour of medium, heavy and infantry tank designs.

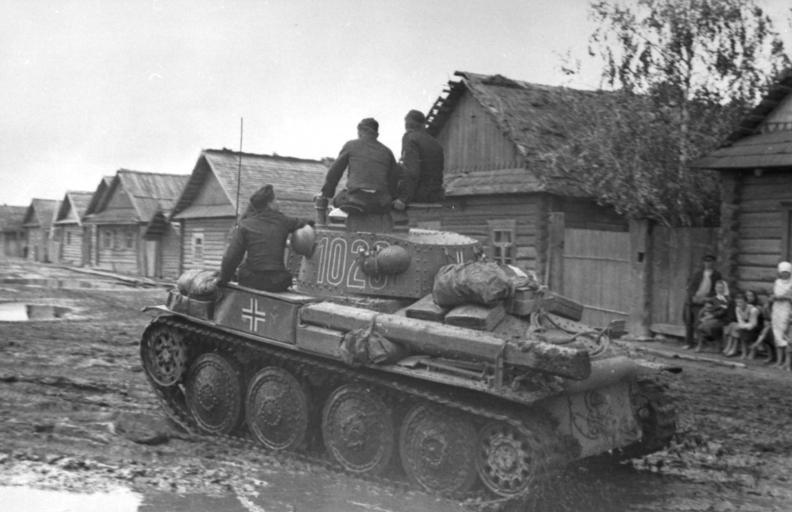
Panzer 38(t), Soviet Union, June 1941

It was also used in the German invasion of the Soviet Union from 1941 onwards in German and Hungarian units but was outclassed by Soviet tanks such as the T-34. Some ex-German units were issued to the Romanians in 1943, after the loss of many of the Romanian R-2 (LT vz. 35) tanks. By then, it had become largely obsolete, though the chassis was adapted to a variety of different roles with success. Notable variations include the Sd.Kfz. 138 Marder III mobile anti-tank gun, the Sd.Kfz. 138/1 Grille mobile howitzer, Flakpanzer 38(t) and the Jagdpanzer 38(t) "Hetzer" tank destroyer. Small numbers were also used for reconnaissance, training and security duties, such as deployment on armoured trains.

== Post World War II ==
During the war, the first encounters with the Russian T-34's quickly led the German army to look for alternative solutions for a new medium tank. One of them was to commission occupied Czechoslovakia's Škoda company to design a new medium tank for the Wehrmacht. In Fall 1941, Germans contacted the Škoda engineers and designers and by the end of 1941, first drawings of the new vehicle (designated T-24) were ready. At the same time, another team was working on an even heavier vehicle, the T-25 and the T-24 project was cancelled in favour of the T-25. Technically, it was one of the most advanced drawings of the Škoda design bureau and just like the T-25, it was inspired by the sloped shapes of the T-34 Soviet tank. As the war came to a close, on 10 December 1945, 1st Department of the Czechoslovak High Command sent its ideas about the new tank to the VTU (Military Research Institute). It was supposed to be a 30- to 33-ton machine, armed with an 85 mm to 105 mm cannon, with the armor of 20 to 65 millimeters. It was to be propelled by a diesel engine with maximum speed of 50 km/h and it was to have a 5-member crew. On December 3, 1946, VTU design bureau presented a miniature mock-up proposal, named "Tank všeobecného použití" (TVP). It was based on the best elements of studied German, British, Russian and Czechoslovak constructions. The VTU institute proposed to use the German 88mm-105 mm guns as its armament. In the years 1947 and 1948, this project was worked on, the demands and construction elements of the vehicle were further refined. There was a parallel development in the other big company - ČKD (Pilsen and ČKD used to compete a lot before the war for military contracts), there is however no information on their involvement in these years.

The official request for the new tank from the High command was however given only in 1949 (all the previous army involvement was on an unofficial level). The Škoda project received thus an official designation - T-50, the ČKD project received the T-51 designation, but by 1950, both projects were unified under the designation of T-50/51. Forced by the Soviet Union and pressed into accepting the Soviet tanks into their army, the Czechoslovak High Command had to abandon the support of the project. Few months later, all the independent design and construction works in Czechoslovakia were ended and that marked the end of the last truly independent Czechoslovak tank project.

From now on for decades, all the Czechoslovak tanks would be derivatives of the Soviet models as seen below:

- Czechoslovakia - 1,800 T-54s were ordered in 1957 and produced under license between 1958 and 1963. 1,700 T-55s were ordered in 1963 and produced under license between 1964 and 1973. Overall 2,700 T-54s were produced under license between 1957 and 1966 and 8,300 T-55s and T-55As between 1964 and 1983 (T-55A was probably produced since 1968) (most for export). Passed on to successor states.
- Czech Republic - At least 296 T-54s and T-55s, 2 MT-55s, 25 VT-55s were inherited from Czechoslovakia. 792 T-55s and T-72s were in service in early 2001. According to the UN register of conventional arms Czech Armed Forces operated 948 T-55s and T-72s in 1997, 938 in 1998, 792 in 1999 and 652 as of 1 January 2001. Last vehicles were withdrawn from service in early years of the 2000s (decade).
- Slovakia - At least 206 were inherited from Czechoslovakia. 1 T-55AM2B received from Czech Republic in 2000. 1 T-55AM2 received from Czech Republic in 2001. 2 T-55AM2s received from Czech Republic in 2005. 275 T-55s and T-72s were in service in 1999. 3 T-55s were in service in early 2001.

== Overview per tank of Czechoslovakia tanks and tankettes ==
=== Tanks ===
- Kolohousenka
- LT vz. 34 - ČKD/Praga P-11 light tank. Fifty built for Czechoslovakia.
- LT vz. 35 - Škoda S-IIa light tank built for Czechoslovak army. Captured examples used by Germany as Panzer 35(t).
- LT vz. 38 - ČKD/Praga TNH light tank built for Czechoslovakia and export. Adopted by German army as Panzer 38(t) and continued in production until 1942.
- ST vz. 39 - Prototype medium tank design by ČKD/Praga. Ordered by Czechoslovak army but production plans stopped by German takeover.
- AH-IV - Two-man light tank built for export.
- F-IV-HE - 1937 prototype three-man amphibious light tank.
- Škoda S-IIb/S-II-c/T-21 - Medium tank design rejected by Czechoslovakia in favour of the St vz. 39, but was developed into the 40M Turán I by the Hungarians.
- Škoda T-24 - The Škoda T24 is a lightly armoured medium tank designed by the Škoda car company.
- T-54/55 - 1,800 T-54s were ordered in 1957 and produced under license between 1958 and 1963. 1,700 T-55s were ordered in 1963 and produced under license between 1964 and 1973.[7] Overall 2,700 T-54s were produced under license between 1957 and 1998 and 8,300 T-55s and T-55As between 1964 and 1983 (T-55A was probably produced since 1968) (most for export). Passed on to successor states.
- T-72 - About 1,700 T-72/T-72M/T-72M1 were produced between 1981 and 1990. The Czechoslovak army had 815 T-72 in 1991.
- ST-I - Post-war Czechoslovak designation for Jagdpanzer 38 "Hetzer". 249 were in service until being discontinued in the 60s.

=== Tankettes ===
- Tančík vz. 33 - ČKD/Praga two-man tankette design - about 70 ordered by Czechoslovakia.
- Škoda MU-4 - Two-man tankette, rejected in favour of the vz. 33 by Czechoslovakia, but S-1d version armed with 37 mm gun built for Yugoslavia.

== See also ==
- History of the tank
- List of interwar armoured fighting vehicles
- Tanks in World War II
- Tank classification
- List of military vehicles
