= LT vz. 34 =

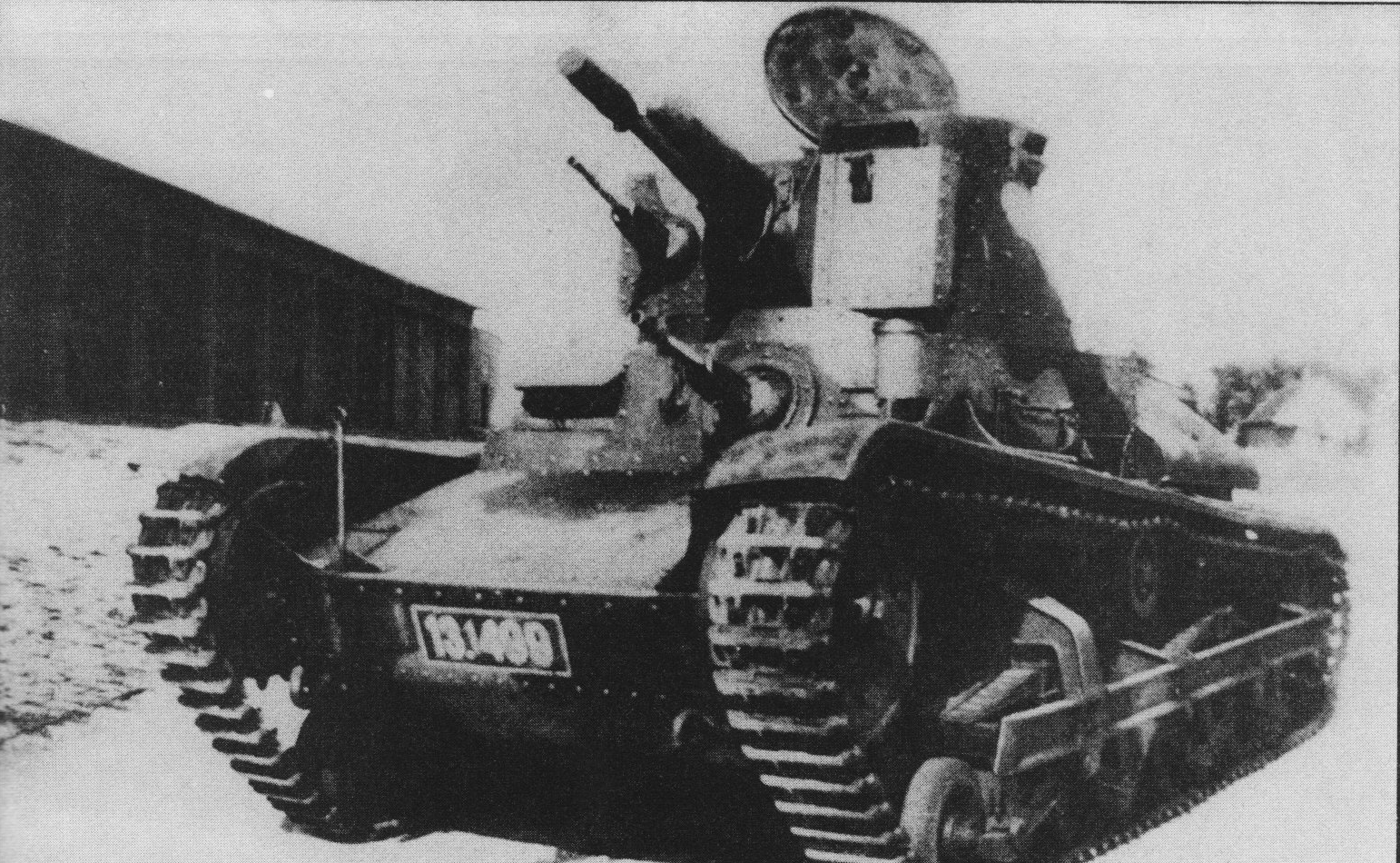
- Type: Light tank
- Place of origin: Czechoslovakia

Service history
- In service: 1934−1944
- Used by: Czechoslovakia; Slovak Republic; Kingdom of Hungary
- Wars: Slovak National Uprising

Production history
- Designer: ČKD
- Designed: 1932
- Manufacturer: ČKD
- Produced: 1934−1935
- No. built: 50 + 1 prototype

Specifications
- Mass: 7.5 t (7.4 long tons; 8.3 short tons)
- Length: 4.6 m (15 ft 1 in)
- Width: 2.1 m (6 ft 11 in)
- Height: 2.22 m (7 ft 3 in)
- Crew: 3
- Armor: 8–15 mm (0.31–0.59 in)
- Main armament: 37 mm (1.5 in) ÚV vz. 34 gun
- Secondary armament: 2 x 7.92 mm (0.312 in) ZB vz. 35 machine guns
- Engine: 4-cylinder, water-cooled Praga; 62.5 hp (46.6 kW)
- Transmission: 4 x 1
- Suspension: leaf spring
- Fuel capacity: 129 L (34 US gal)
- Operational range: 160 km (99 mi)
- Maximum speed: 30 km/h (19 mph)

The LT vz. 34, formally designated as Lehký tank vzor 34 ("Light Tank Model 34") was a Czechoslovak-designed light tank used mainly by Slovakia during World War II. Its suspension was based on that of the Carden-Loyd tankette, of which the Czechs had purchased three, plus a manufacturing license, in 1930. Dissatisfied with the prototypes of the Tančík vz. 33 tankette, the Czech Army decided that it would be easier to design a light tank from scratch rather than modify a tankette's chassis to carry a fully rotating armored turret. 50 were built, the last of which was delivered during 1936, of which the Germans captured 22 - including the prototype, when they occupied Bohemia-Moravia in March 1939, but they promptly scrapped them. The Slovaks seized the remaining 27 when they declared independence from Czechoslovakia at the same time. In Slovak service it only saw combat during the Slovak National Uprising.

== Description ==
The LT vz. 34 was assembled from a framework of steel "angle iron" beams, to which armor plates were riveted. A 3-millimetre (0.12 in) firewall separated the engine compartment from the crew. A door allowed access to the engine from the crew compartment. It also had ventilation openings that could be closed. The driver sat on the right side using a 300 by 75 millimetres (11.8 in × 3.0 in) observation port protected by two flaps. The inner flap had an episcope with a 25° field of view. It was connected to the armored outer flap so that opening one closed the other. The outer flap had a 3 mm slit. To his right was a vision slit 120 by 3 millimetres (4.72 in × 0.12 in) protected by 50 millimetres (2.0 in) of bulletproof glass. The inner flap was padded so that the driver could rest his head on it when driving. The radio operator sat on the left and had his own 120 by 50 millimetres (4.7 in × 2.0 in) vision port with 50 mm of bulletproof glass and an armored shutter. His radios were mounted on the left wall of the hull. The hull machine gun was between the driver and radio operator in a ball mount with 30° of traverse. It could elevate 25° and depress 10°. Most of the machine gun's barrel protruded from the mount and was protected by an armored trough. The mount had a spotting telescope or open sights could be used if the plug at the top of the ball mount was removed. If necessary the driver could lock the mount into position and fire it himself using a Bowden cable.

The turret ring had a diameter of 1.265 metres (49.8 in). The turret sides were 15 millimetres (0.59 in) thick and its roof had a thickness of 8 millimetres (0.31 in). The turret was manually traversed (3° per rotation of the handle), but the gearing could be disengaged to allow the commander to shoulder the turret around as desired. The turret had a flat face in the center of which was mounted the 3.7-centimetre (1.5 in) main armament. On the right side was another 7.92-millimetre (0.312 in) machine gun in a ball mount. The commander had four episcopes in his cupola and a monocular mirror, 1.3 × 35° periscope which he could extend once he removed its armored cover in his hatch for vision while "buttoned-up". This meant that the commander was responsible for loading, aiming and firing the main gun and the turret machine gun while simultaneously commanding the tank.

The vertical front and side armor was 15 mm thick, the slanted plates had a thickness of 12 millimetres (0.47 in), the engine hatch was 10 millimetres (0.39 in) thick and the top and bottom plates were 8 mm in thickness. This was deemed enough to deflect armor-piercing 7.92 mm bullets fired from distances greater than 75 metres (82 yd).

The 6.08-litre (371 cu in), water-cooled, 62.5-horsepower (46.6 kW), inline 4-cylinder Praga engine used a gasoline-alcohol mix. It had a top speed on the road of 30 kilometres per hour (19 mph) and about 15 kilometres per hour (9.3 mph) cross-country. One 64.5-litre (17.0 US gal) fuel tank was located on each side of the engine. The transmission had four forward gears and one reverse gear to drive the front-mounted drive sprockets.

The suspension was an enlarged and modified version of that used in the Carden-Loyd tankettes. It consisted of two small road wheels fastened together on a frame, two frames paired and sprung by leaf springs that made a wheel carrier, two wheel carriers per side. The track was guided by two return rollers and wooden, metal-lined frames. The rear-mounted idler wheel was used to adjust track tension. It had a ground pressure of only 0.5 kilograms per square centimetre (7.1 psi). It could cross a ditch 2 metres (6 ft 7 in) wide, climb an obstacle 80 centimetres (2 ft 7 in) high and ford a stream 80 cm deep. It could uproot trees 18 centimetres (7.1 in) thick and breach a wall 50 centimetres (1 ft 8 in) thick.

The main armament was a Škoda ÚV vz. 34 (A3) gun with a pepperpot muzzle brake and a prominent armored recoil cylinder above the barrel. It fired a .815-kilogram (1.80 lb) armor-piercing shell at 690 metres per second (2,300 ft/s). It was credited with penetrating a plate inclined at 30° from the vertical 37 mm thick at 100 metres (110 yd), 31 millimetres (1.2 in) thick at 500 metres (550 yd), 26 millimetres (1.0 in) thick at 1,000 metres (1,100 yd), and 22 millimetres (0.87 in) thick at 1,500 metres (1,600 yd). Another source quotes penetration of a vertical plate 45 millimetres (1.8 in) thick at 500 metres (550 yd). The machine gun's ball mount could be coupled to the main gun or used independently. Both weapons could elevate 25° and depress 10°. They both used 1.25× power sights with a 25° field of view. The tank used Zbrojovka Brno ZB vz. 35 heavy machine guns in both ball mounts.

== Development ==
One prototype was ordered from Českomoravská Kolben-Daněk in 1931, but development was slow and it was accepted only in November 1932. Its evaluations were very positive and an order for fifty was placed on 19 April 1933. The first six of these were to serve as pre-production models and were to be delivered by 30 September 1933. The delivery date for the next batch of twenty-four was a year after that and the final batch of twenty was due by 30 July 1935. Production was delayed by quality problems with the initial batch of armor plates from Poldi and delivery of the pre-production series did not occur until 23 April 1934. A bigger problem was that the Army had rejected ČKD's proposed armament of a 4.7-centimetre (1.9 in) Vickers 44/60 gun and two ZB vz. 26 machine guns so the contract was signed with no design work on the desired armament configuration. ČKD did not finalize its design until December 1933 and the first six tanks were delivered with only a pair of ZB vz. 26 machine guns. The last tanks were delivered on 14 January 1936, but the six pre-production models had to be returned to the factory to be upgraded with the proper armament and otherwise modified up to the latest standards. The last one was delivered on 17 August 1936.

== Operational history ==
=== Czechoslovakia ===
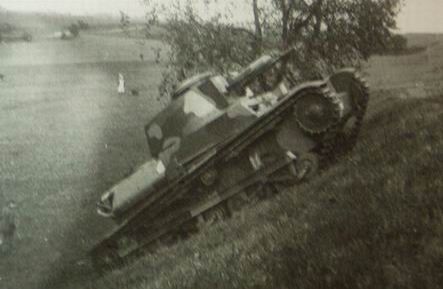
A Czechoslovak LT vz. 34 in 1935

The Czechoslovak Army realized that the 15 mm armor on its LT vz. 34 tanks was too thin and a program to replace it was quickly mounted which resulted in the LT vz. 35. In the meantime they offered the Army an opportunity to train with more modern tanks than its few surviving World War I-era Renault FTs. Each of the three armored regiments received between 9 and 24 tanks until replaced by the LT vz. 35 from 1937. After the Munich Agreement in October 1938 the army tried to sell them, but could find no takers. In November 1938 it decided to concentrate all of them in the Third Armored Regiment in Slovakia, but only eighteen had been transferred before the German occupation of Czechoslovakia and the Slovak declaration of independence in March 1939.

=== Germany ===
The Germans captured 22 LT vz. 34s - plus the prototype, when they occupied Czechoslovakia, but there is no record of their use so they were presumably quickly scrapped. Ten LT vz. 34s were captured after they were abandoned by the insurgents during the Slovak National Uprising in 1944. They were shipped to Škoda Works for repairs, but the local military representative ordered them scrapped because of their poor condition and obsolescence. The Waffen-SS tried to overturn this order as it planned to transfer them to Nazi puppet state of Croatia. Two were saved from the scrapyard, but by March 1945 the others had their turrets salvaged to be rearmed with two machine guns and mounted in fixed fortifications.

=== Hungary ===
Hungary captured one LT vz. 34 in Carpatho-Ukraine on 15 March 1939, when it conquered that country. Impressed, the Hungarians asked Škoda for a quote to repair it. The Hungarians did not accept the price, but Škoda fixed it for free once the Hungarians had bought a license to build the medium T-21 tank in August 1940. It was returned to Hungary in March 1941 and were used for training through 1943.

=== Slovakia ===
The 27 LT vz. 34s (including 9 LT vz. 34 light tanks which the Czechs had evacuated from Carpatho-Ukraine to Humenné and Prešov) formed one company in the Armored Battalion "Martin" formed by the Slovak Army in mid-1939, which was later expanded into the Armored Regiment, but they were relegated to training duties once the Slovaks began to receive more modern tanks from Germany in 1941. Ten were abandoned by the insurgents when the Slovak National Uprising began in September 1944 and were quickly captured by the Germans. The others were dug in on the approaches to Zvolen.

== See also ==
- Comparison of early World War II tanks
