= ST vz. 39 =

Czechoslovak medium tank prototype

ST vz 39
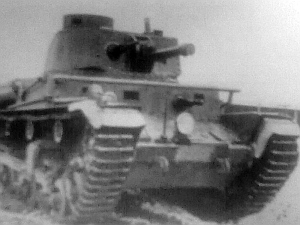
- Type: Medium tank
- Place of origin: Czechoslovakia

Production history
- Designer: ČKD
- Manufacturer: ČKD
- Produced: 1937−40
- No. built: 2 prototypes

Specifications
- Mass: 16.20 t (15.94 long tons; 17.86 short tons)
- Length: 5.35 m (17 ft 7 in)
- Width: 2.27 m (7 ft 5 in)
- Height: 2.34 m (7 ft 8 in) overall
- Crew: 4
- Armor: 12–32 mm
- Main armament: 1x Škoda 47 mm A11
- Secondary armament: 2x 7.92 mm ZB-53 machine gun
- Engine: Praga water-cooled 8-cylinder gasoline engine 192.2 kW (257.7 hp)
- Power/weight: 15 hp (11.8 kW) / tonne
- Transmission: 4 speed
- Suspension: leaf spring
- Fuel capacity: 260 l
- Operational range: 150 km (93 mi)
- Maximum speed: 43.5 km/h (27.0 mph)

ST vz. 39, also known by its factory designation V-8-H, was a Czechoslovak medium tank developed by ČKD in the late 1930s. Only two prototypes were ever built.

== Design and development ==
In the fall of 1937 a competition was launched for a new medium tank to equip the Czechoslovak Army; Škoda, ČKD and Tatra competed. The most promising design was the ČKD prototype, designated the V-8-H (later ST vz. 39). The first prototype had 143 design flaws identified, of which 16 were considered significant. The most serious issues centred on engine design, the reworking of which satisfied the concerns of the army.

Due to the worsening international situation, the army decided to order 300 tanks and, later, a further 150 more but the order was canceled after the Munich Agreement of 1938 gave the Sudetenland area of Czechoslovakia to Germany. After the occupation of the remainder of Czechoslovakia on March 15, 1939, representatives of the German armaments office selected the V-8-H for testing by the Army at Eisenach. As a result of a fortnight's testing, an order was issued in November 1939 for production of another prototype. This was to be delivered without turret and armament, with a concrete block to simulate the load. This marked a prototype V-8-HII (second option), or V-8-Hz (trial) in the second half of 1940, underwent tests in Germany at Kummersdorf. There was no production order as the V-8-H specification were similar to the already under production Panzer III.

After the occupation, the company tried to break through with a tank on the international market. Romania is the first reported, as requested by the former Czechoslovak prototypes of the T-21, V-8-H, R-2a. All tanks passed the tests in Romania successfully. Reluctant to choose a tank design, it considered first the R-2a, then the V-8-H, but later opted for a T-21, of which 216 were ordered. The company tried to offer the tank to Sweden, China, USSR, and Italy. The last attempt was with Turkey which would have used the Skoda A7 gun of the LT vz 38 but no order was placed.

Both prototypes survived war, but were scrapped soon afterward.
