= T-32 (Š-I-D) =

Škoda Š-I-d (T-32)
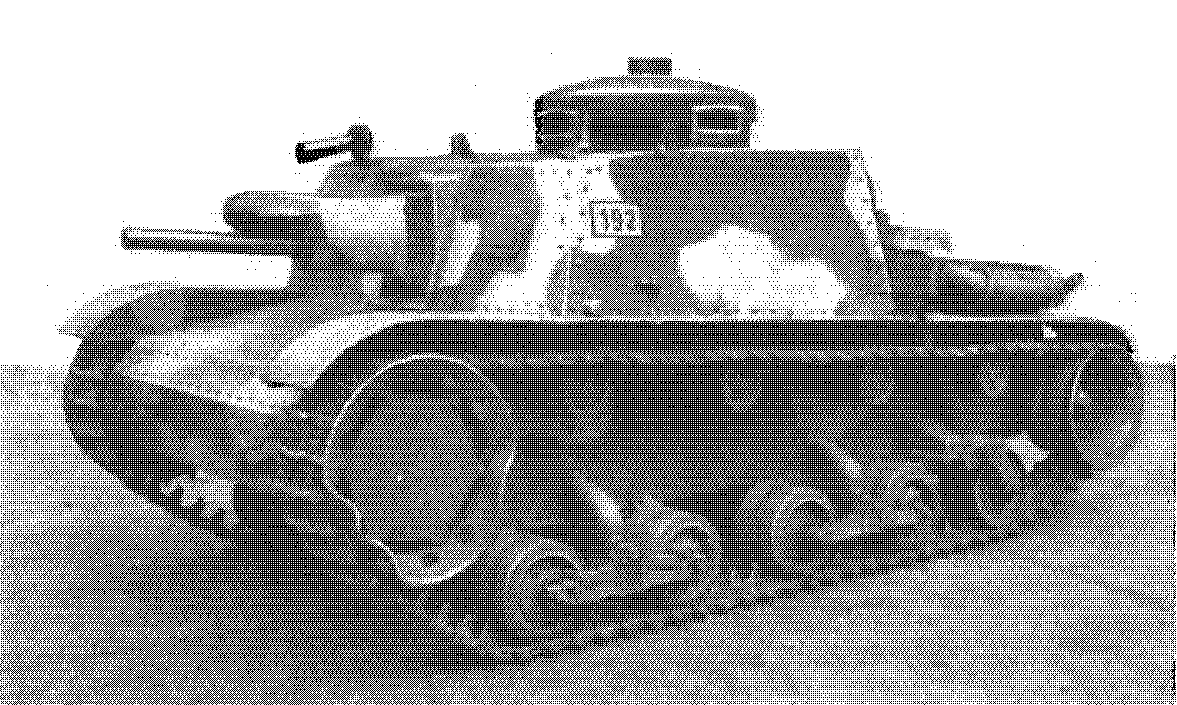
- Type: Tankette
- Place of origin: Czechoslovakia

Service history
- Used by: Kingdom of Yugoslavia
- Wars: Invasion of Yugoslavia

Production history
- Designer: Škoda Works
- Designed: 1935
- Manufacturer: Škoda Works
- Produced: 1936
- No. built: 8

Specifications
- Length: 3.58 m (11 ft 9 in)
- Width: 1.76 m (5 ft 9 in)
- Height: 1.95 m (6 ft 5 in)
- Crew: 2
- Main armament: 1 × 37mm A3 anti-tank gun
- Secondary armament: 1 x ZB vz. 30 light machine gun
- Engine: Skoda 6-cylinder petrol engine
- Maximum speed: 25 mph (41 km/h) on roads

The Škoda Š-I-d (T-32) tankette was a Czechoslovak-designed tankette used exclusively by the Kingdom of Yugoslavia during World War II. Its design was based on the Škoda MU-4 tank and built specifically to Yugoslav specifications.

== History ==
In 1935 at the request of the Royal Yugoslav Army, Škoda developed a prototype of the T-32 by replacing the main armament of an MU-4 with a 37mm A3 anti-tank gun. Satisfied with the prototype, the Yugoslav Army ordered eight vehicles in 1936. The eight vehicles were delivered and formed their own independent armored company as part of the Royal Yugoslav Army. Although being assigned to the army, the tanks were initially used for air base defense duties at the Royal Yugoslav Air Force base near Zemun.

== Operational history ==
In April 1941 at the commencement of the German Invasion of Yugoslavia, the eight T-32s were stationed in and around the Zemun airfield. However, the tanks were ordered south to the city of Niš in order to attack Axis forces advancing on the city. En route to Niš, the tank column engaged German forces near the town of Topola. Some of the T-32 tanks were captured intact by the Germans after crews abandoned their vehicles. These captured tanks were sent to the Škoda factory to be refitted as training vehicles for Waffen-SS panzer division units. Following refitting, they were put into service with the designation Pz.Kpf.Wg. 732(j).

== Appearance ==
The Royal Yugoslav Army painted their T-32s in a dark green, ochre and chocolate-brown camouflage pattern.
