= 3,7cm KPÚV vz. 34 =

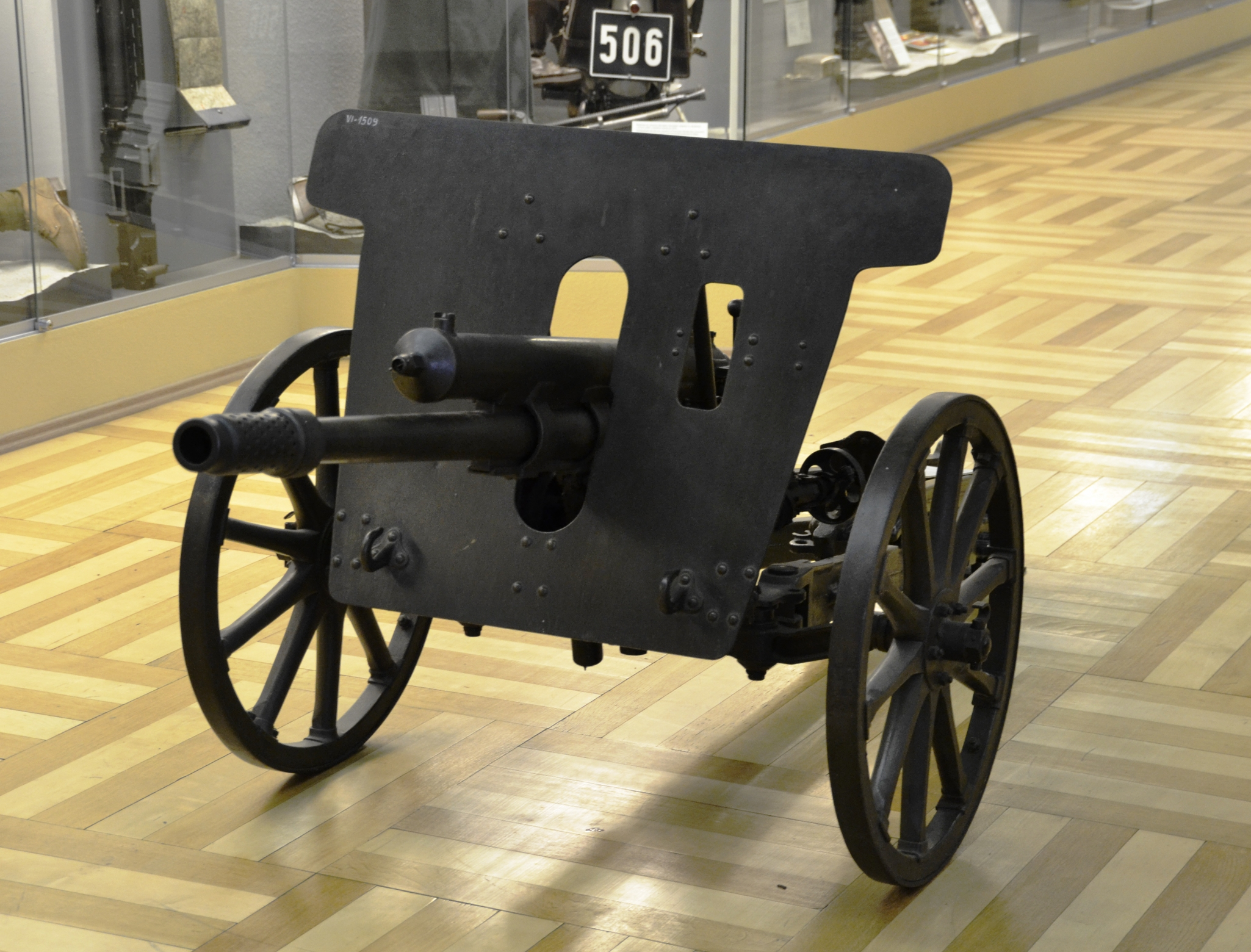
- In Armádní muzeum Žižkov
- Type: Anti-tank gun
- Place of origin: Czechoslovakia

Service history
- In service: 1934–1944
- Used by: Czechoslovakia; Slovakia; Nazi Germany
- Wars: World War II

Production history
- Designer: Škoda Works
- Designed: 1934
- Manufacturer: Škoda Works
- Produced: 1934–1939
- Variants: ÚV vz. 34 tank gun

Specifications
- Barrel length: 1.48 m (4 ft 10 in) L/40
- Shell: Fixed QF 37 x 268 mm R
- Shell weight: .815 kg (1 lb 12.7 oz)
- Caliber: 37.2 mm (1.46 in)
- Breech: Semi-automatic
- Carriage: Split-trail
- Rate of fire: 12 rounds per minute
- Muzzle velocity: 675 m/s (2,210 ft/s)
- Effective firing range: 1,000 m (1,100 yd)
- Maximum firing range: 4,000 m (4,400 yd)

The 3,7 cm KPÚV vz. 34 (Czech: kanón proti útočné vozbě) (designated 3,7 cm PaK 34(t) in German service) was an anti-tank gun produced by the Škoda Works in Czechoslovakia. Škoda's own designation for it was A3. It is not known if guns seized by Germany after the occupation of Bohemia-Moravia saw service in World War II. Slovakia acquired 113 when it declared independence from Czechoslovakia in March 1939.

It was designed to a Czech Army requirement to penetrate 30 mm (1.2 in) of armor at 1,000 m (1,100 yd) in 1934. It also fired a HE shell out to a maximum range of 4,000 m (4,400 yd). The gun had a small shield and wooden-spoked wheels, although some were fitted with pneumatic wheels.

== ÚV vz. 34 tank gun ==
The ÚV vz. 34 fired a .815 kg (1.80 lb) armor-piercing shell at a velocity of 690 m/s (2,300 ft/s). The vz.34 comprised the main armament of a number of Czech/German armored vehicles.

Armored vehicles:

- T-32 (Š-I-D) - Czech tank-destroyer.
- LT vz. 34 - Czech light-tank.
- LT vz. 35/Panzer 35(t) - Czech/German light-tank.

== Performance ==
Armor penetration table
Range	Contact angle 30°
100 m (110 yd)	37 mm (1.5 in)
500 m (550 yd)	31 mm (1.2 in)*
1,000 m (1,100 yd)	26 mm (1.0 in)
1,500 m (1,600 yd)	22 mm (0.87 in)

*Another source quotes penetration of a vertical plate of 45 mm (1.8 in) thick armor at 500 m (550 yd).

== See also ==
- Weapons of Czechoslovakia interwar period
