= Škoda MU-4 =

Škoda MU-4 / Škoda Š-I
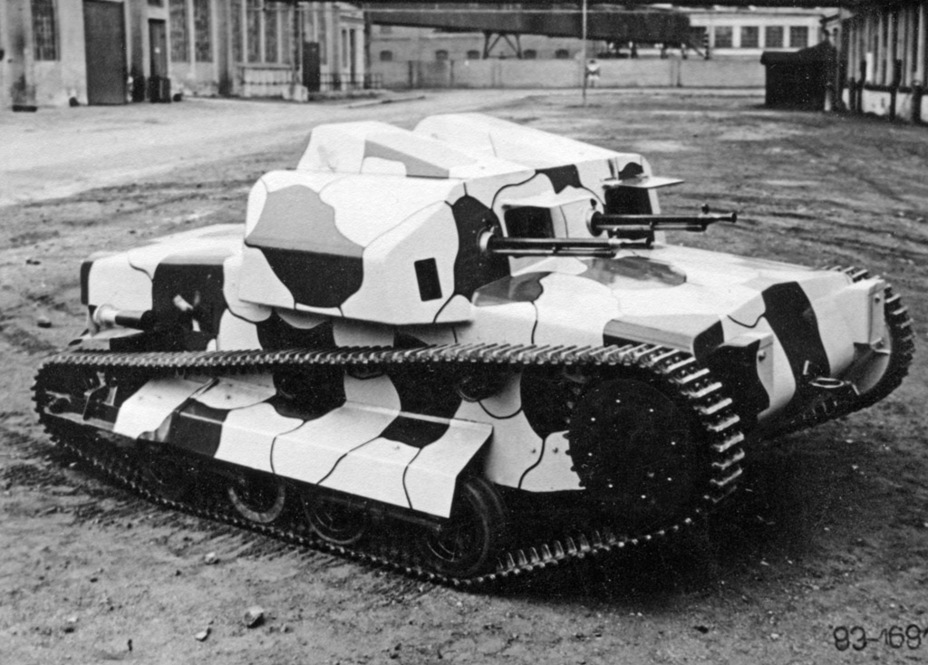
- Type: Tankette
- Place of origin: Czechoslovakia

Production history
- Designer: Škoda
- Designed: 1933
- Produced: 1933
- No. built: 1

Specifications
- Length: 2.98 m (9 ft 9 in)
- Width: 1.85 m (6 ft 1 in)
- Height: 1.3 m (4 ft 3 in)
- Crew: 3
- Main armament: 2 × 7.92mm ZB vz. 26 light machine guns
- Engine: Skoda 2660 cc 4-cylinder petrol engine
- Maximum speed: 25 mph (41 km/h) on roads

The Škoda MU-4 Tankette was a Czechoslovak tankette design of 1933. It was designed as a successor to the Škoda MU-2 tank.

== History ==
In 1932, the company Škoda tried to develop a new tank after the unsatisfactory Škoda MU-2. The result was the MU-4, made from a modified Carden-Loyd Mk. VI tankette chassis, which was entered into a competition for tankettes in the Czechoslovak Army, where it lost to the Tančík vz. 33. It was then entered into a competition for the Yugoslav Army, where it lost to both the Polish TK-3 (also developed from the Carden-Loyd) and the ČKD PI. The Škoda MU-4 was then offered to Afghanistan, Hungary, and Sweden, but was rejected by all of them. In the end, only a single prototype was made, which surprisingly survived World War II. The prototype was acquired by the Military History Institute Prague in 1972 and was restored to running condition. The prototype is now in the Military Museum Lešany where it is occasionally shown in exhibits.
