= Tančík vz. 33 =

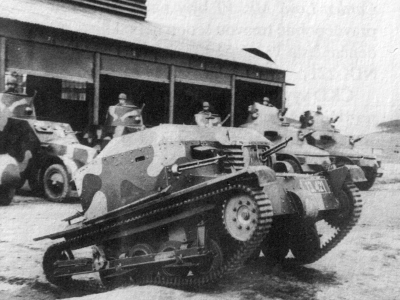
- Type: Tankette
- Place of origin: Czechoslovakia

Service history
- In service: 1934−1944
- Used by: Czechoslovakia; Slovakia
- Wars: Slovak National Uprising

Production history
- Designer: ČKD
- Designed: 1930−1933
- Manufacturer: ČKD
- Unit cost: about 131,200 Czechoslovak koruna
- Produced: 1934
- No. built: 70 + 4 prototypes

Specifications
- Mass: 2.3 t (2.5 short tons)
- Length: 2.7 m (8 ft 10 in)
- Width: 1.75 m (5 ft 9 in)
- Height: 1.45 m (4 ft 9 in)
- Crew: 2
- Armor: 4–12 mm (0.16–0.47 in)
- Main armament: 2 × 7.92 mm (0.312 in) ZB vz. 26 light machine guns
- Engine: 4-cylinder, water-cooled Praga; 30 horsepower (22 kW)
- Transmission: 4 × 1
- Suspension: leaf spring
- Fuel capacity: 50 litres (13 US gal)
- Operational range: 100 km (62 mi)
- Maximum speed: 35 km/h (22 mph)

The Tančík vz. 33 (Czech: Tankette model 33) was a Czechoslovak-designed tankette used mainly by Slovakia during World War II. Seventy-four were built. The Germans seized forty when they occupied Bohemia-Moravia in March 1939; there is no record of their use. The Slovak Republic inherited thirty at the same time when it declared independence from Czechoslovakia. In Slovak service it only saw combat during the Slovak National Uprising.

== Description ==
The Tančík vz. 33 was assembled from a framework of steel "angle iron" beams, to which armor plates were riveted. The driver sat on the right side using a 300 mm × 125 mm (11.8 in × 4.9 in) observation port protected by 50 millimetres (2.0 in) of bulletproof glass and an armored shutter which had a 2 mm (0.079 in) slit. The gunner sat on the left and had a similar vision port half the size of the driver's. His ZB vz. 26 machine gun was mounted in a ball mount directly to his front. There were similar vision ports on the sides and the rear. The driver's machine gun was fixed and he fired it using a Bowden cable; 2,600 rounds were stored for the machine guns.

The front armor was 12 mm (0.47 in) thick, the sides had a thickness of 8 mm (0.31 in), the top was 6 mm (0.24 in) thick and the bottom plates were 6 mm (0.24 in) in thickness. This was deemed enough to deflect armor-piercing 7.92 mm (0.312 in) bullets fired from distances greater than 125 metres (137 yd) from the front and 185 metres (202 yd) from the sides. Both were supposed to withstand ordinary bullets from over 50 metres (55 yd).

The 1.95-litre (119 cu in), water-cooled, 30 horsepower (22 kW), inline 4-cylinder Praga engine sat in the fighting compartment. It had a top speed on the road of 35 km/h (22 mph). One 50-litre (13 US gal) fuel tank was located to the left of the engine. The transmission had four forward gears and one reverse gear. Transmission, reduction gear, differential, driving shafts and brakes were all taken from the Praga AN truck.

The suspension was a modified version of that used in the Carden-Loyd tankettes. It consisted of two small road wheels fastened together on a frame, two frames paired and sprung by leaf springs that made a wheel carrier, one wheel carrier per side. The track was guided by wooden, metal-lined frames. It had a ground pressure of only 0.5 kg/cm^{2}. The vehicle could cross a ditch 1.2 m (3 ft 11 in) wide, climb an obstacle 0.5 metres (20 in) high and ford a stream 0.4 metres (16 in) deep.

== Development ==
The Czechoslovak Army bought three Carden-Loyd tankettes and a production license for them in 1930, Českomoravská Kolben-Daněk building four copies that same year as prototypes for future orders. The Carden-Loyds were evaluated during the Fall maneuvers and revealed numerous problems: the crews had very poor vision through the narrow slits, the machine gun had a very narrow field of fire, and the crewmen had a difficult time communicating. Furthermore, they were slow, underpowered and often broke down. One of the P-1 prototypes was rebuilt to address these issues with additional vision ports in all directions, internal ammunition storage and the machine gun's field of fire increased to 60°. It was extensively tested during 1931—1932 and a few other changes were made as a result. The armor was increased from 6 to 8 mm (0.24 to 0.31 in) and from 9 to 12 mm (0.35 to 0.47 in) and a fixed machine gun was added for the driver. Two of the other prototypes were rebuilt to the same standard; all three were officially accepted by the Army on 17 October 1933. The other prototype was eventually given to the Shah of Iran. The order for seventy was placed on 19 April 1933, all being delivered by October 1934.

== Operational history ==
=== Czechoslovakia ===
The 1934 Fall maneuvers validated the misgivings of many in the Army. The gunner had trouble holding his weapon at speeds over 10 kilometres per hour (6.2 mph) and could not lay it properly at all. The driver could not use his machine gun in addition to driving the vehicle. The vehicle had trouble negotiating the terrain, and proved unsuitable for reconnaissance because, while "buttoned-up", the crew could only see the road ahead of them. The lack of a radio made coordination among vehicles in a platoon or larger-sized formation impossible.

While used as a substitute for the light tanks not yet in service during 1934–1936, the Army decided to organize them in three-vehicle platoons, and assigned them to support units in the border areas. These platoons were heavily used suppressing the protests and violence instigated by Konrad Henlein's Sudeten German Party (Sudetendeutsche Partei - SdP) and the Sudetendeutsche Freikorps (paramilitary groups trained in Germany by SS-instructors) between May and October 1938. They were also used to repel Hungarian and Polish border-crossers, sometimes up to a battalion in strength. They helped to screen the infantry when they had to evacuate southern Slovakia after the First Vienna Award on 2 November 1938.

=== Germany ===
The Germans captured forty Tančík vz. 33s when they occupied Czechoslovakia, but there is no record of their use so they were presumably quickly scrapped or relegated to training duties.

=== Slovakia ===
The thirty Tančík vz. 33s formed one platoon in the Armored Battalion "Martin" formed by the Slovak Army in mid-1939, but they were relegated to training duties during 1940. They saw some use by the insurgents when the Slovak National Uprising began in September 1944, but little is known of their activities.

== See also ==
- Skoda MU-4
