= Panzer 35(t) =

Czechoslovak light tank used by Nazi Germany

Panzerkampfwagen 35(t)
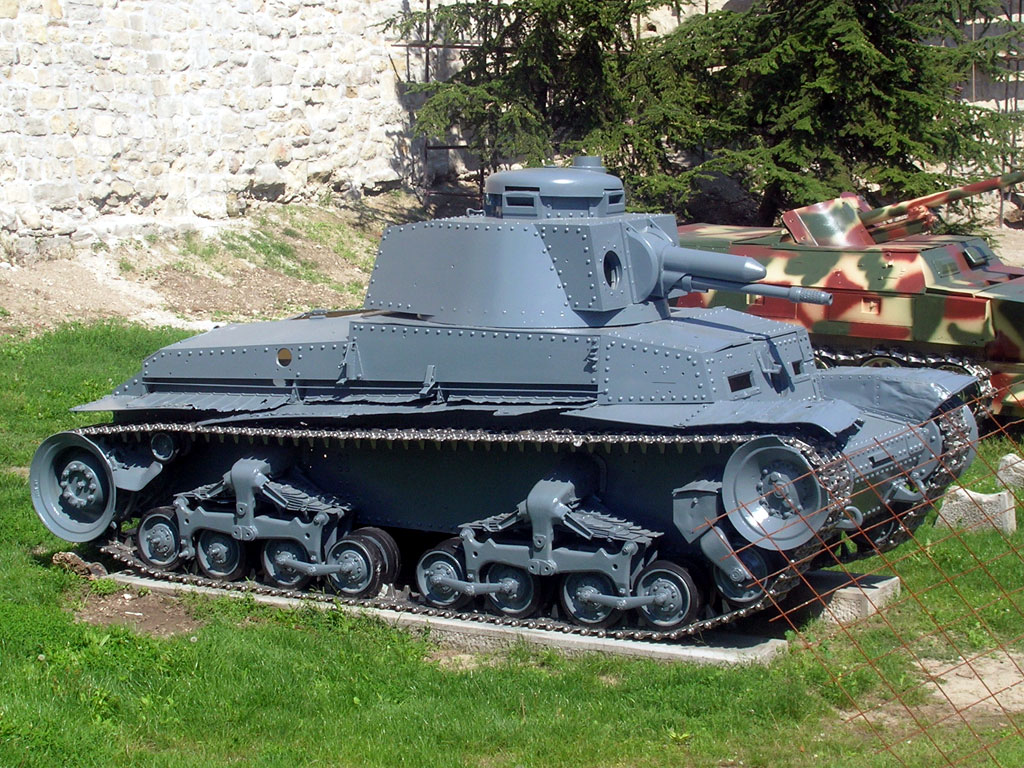
- Panzer 35(t) at the Belgrade Military Museum
- Type: Light tank
- Place of origin: Czechoslovakia

Service history
- In service: 1936–1950s
- Used by: Czechoslovakia; Nazi Germany; Kingdom of Romania; Slovak Republic; Kingdom of Bulgaria; Kingdom of Hungary
- Wars: World War II

Production history
- Designer: Škoda
- Designed: 1934–1936
- Manufacturer: Škoda, ČKD
- Unit cost: 741,868 or 745,068 Czechoslovak koruna
- Produced: 1936–1940
- No. built: 434
- Variants: T-11, R-2c, TACAM R-2

Specifications (Panzerkampfwagen 35(t))
- Mass: 10.5 t (10.3 long tons; 11.6 short tons)
- Length: 4.90 m (16 ft 1 in)
- Width: 2.06 m (6 ft 9 in)
- Height: 2.37 m (7 ft 9 in)
- Crew: 4 (3 in original design)
- Armor: 8–25 mm (0.31–0.98 in)
- Main armament: 3.7 cm (1.5 in) KwK 34(t) gun
- Secondary armament: 2 x 7.92 mm (0.3 in) MG 37(t) machine gun
- Engine: 4-cylinder, water-cooled Škoda T11/0 gasoline 120 hp (89 kW)
- Power/weight: 11 hp/tonne
- Transmission: 6 x 6
- Suspension: leaf spring
- Fuel capacity: 153 L (40 US gal)
- Operational range: 190 km (120 mi) (road); 115 km (71 mi) (cross-country)
- Maximum speed: 34 km/h (21 mph)

The Panzerkampfwagen 35(t), commonly shortened to Panzer 35(t) or abbreviated as Pz.Kpfw. 35(t), was a Czechoslovak-designed light tank used mainly by Nazi Germany during World War II. The letter (t) stood for tschechisch (German for "Czech"). In Czechoslovak service, it had the formal designation Lehký tank vzor 35 (Light Tank Model 35), but was commonly referred to as the LT vz. 35 or LT-35.

A total of 434 were built; of these, the Germans seized 244 when they occupied Bohemia-Moravia in March 1939 and the Slovak Republic acquired 52 when they declared independence from Czechoslovakia at the same time. Others were exported to Bulgaria and Romania. In German service, it saw combat during the early years of World War II, notably the invasion of Poland, the Battle of France and the invasion of the Soviet Union before being retired or sold off in 1942. It was used for the remainder of the war by other countries and as a training tank in Bulgaria into the 1950s.

== Description ==
The Panzerkampfwagen 35(t) was assembled from a framework of steel "angle iron" beams to which the armour plates were riveted. A 4 mm (0.16 in) firewall separated the engine compartment from the crew. It had several mesh-covered openings to allow access to the engine and improve ventilation by drawing air in through the commander's hatch. This had the advantage of rapidly dispersing gun combustion gases when firing, (Note: This scheme is used by the modern American M2/M3 Bradley Fighting Vehicle, although it uses removable panels in lieu of the firewall.) but several disadvantages. The constant draft generated by the engine greatly affected the crew during cold weather, the danger of an engine fire reaching the crew compartment was increased and the engine noise and heat increased crew fatigue.

The driver sat on the right side of the tank using a 390-by-90-millimetre (15.4 in × 3.5 in) observation port protected by 50 millimetres (2.0 in) of bulletproof glass and an armoured shutter 28 millimetres (1.1 in) thick. To his right was a vision slit (120 by 3 millimetres (4.72 in × 0.12 in)) with a similar thickness of bulletproof glass. The Germans replaced the original three colored lights used by the Czechs to communicate with the driver with an intercom system. The radio operator sat on the left and had his own 150-by-75-millimetre (5.9 in × 3.0 in) observation port with the same protection as the driver's. His radios were mounted on the left wall of the hull. The hull machine gun was between the driver and radio operator in a ball mount capable of 30° of traverse, 25° of elevation and depressing up to 10°. Most of the machine gun's barrel protruded from the mount and was protected by an armoured trough. The mount had a spotting telescope, but open sights could be used if the plug at the top of the ball mount was removed. If necessary, the driver could lock the mount into position and fire it himself using a Bowden cable. The driver's hatch was exposed to direct fire and could be damaged from the front.

The turret ring had a diameter of 1.267 metres (49.9 in). The turret had a flat face in the center of which was mounted the 3.72-centimetre (1.46 in) main gun. On the right side was another 7.92-millimetre (0.312 in) machine gun in a ball mount. The commander had four episcopes in his cupola and a monocular mirror, 1.3 × 30° periscope which he could extend, once he had removed its armoured cover in his hatch, to give vision while "buttoned-up". As the sole occupant of the turret, the commander was responsible for loading, aiming and firing the main gun and the turret machine gun while simultaneously commanding the tank. The Germans added an extra crewman on the right side of the turret to load the main gun and to operate the turret machine gun. Some ammunition had to be removed to accommodate him.

The 8.62-litre (526 cu in) Škoda T-11/0 four-cylinder, water-cooled engine produced 120 horsepower (89 kW) at 1,800 rpm. Two fuel tanks were fitted, the main tank with a capacity of 124 litres (27 imp gal; 33 US gal) was on the left side of the engine and the 29-litre (6.4 imp gal; 7.7 US gal) auxiliary tank was on the other side. The engine could run on gasoline, an alcohol-gasoline mixture, and "Dynalkohol" (an alcohol-benzole mixture). It was mounted in the rear along with the six-speed transmission which drove rear-mounted drive sprockets. The suspension was derived from the Vickers 6-Ton tank; eight small pairs of road wheels on four bogies per side, each pair of bogies sprung by a single leaf spring, a front idler wheel, and four track return wheels. An unsprung road wheel was located directly underneath the idler wheel to improve obstacle crossing. The transmission, brakes and steering were mechanically assisted with compressed air, reducing driver fatigue. This last feature proved problematic in the extreme conditions of the Eastern Front.

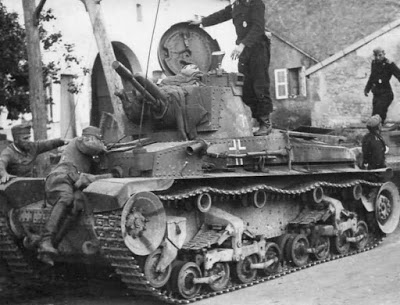
Pz.Kpfw. 35(t) of the 6th Panzer Division, Eastern front, 1941

The main armament was a Škoda 37mm ÚV vz. 34 (German designation "KwK 34(t)") gun with a pepperpot muzzle brake and a prominent armoured recoil cylinder above the barrel. Škoda called it the A3. It fired a 0.815-kilogram (1.8 lb) armour-piercing shell at 690 metres per second (2,300 ft/s). It was credited with penetrating a plate inclined at 30° from the vertical 37 millimetres (1.5 in) thick at 100 metres (110 yd), 31 millimetres (1.2 in) thick at 500 metres (550 yd), 26 millimetres (1.0 in) thick at 1,000 metres (1,100 yd), and 22 millimetres (0.87 in) thick at 1,500 metres (1,600 yd). Kliment and Francev quote penetration of a vertical plate 45 millimetres (1.8 in) thick at 500 metres (550 yd). The machine gun's ball mount could be coupled to the main gun or used independently. Both weapons could elevate 25° and depress 10°. They both used 2.6× power sights with a 25° field of view. Initially the tank used Zbrojovka Brno Tk vz. 35 machine guns, but these were exchanged for ZB vz. 37s during 1938. This was adopted by the Germans as the MG 37(t).

In German use, 72 rounds of 37 mm ammunition were carried. These were stored in 6-round boxes: three on the hull side wall, eight in the turret overhang and one ready box above the gun on the turret roof. For the machine gun, 1,800 rounds of belted 7.92 mm ammunition were carried. The machine gun ammunition was in 100 round belts, stored three to a box. In Czech service, the LT vz. 35 carried 78 rounds (24 AP, 54 HE) and 2,700 rounds of machine gun ammunition, the difference being removed to make room for the fourth crewmember in German service. The German command tank version (Panzerbefehlswagen 35(t)) exchanged some ammunition - exactly how much is not known - for another radio set and a gyrocompass. It could be recognized by the prominent "clothesline" radio antenna mounted on the rear deck.

=== Armour ===
The gun mantlet was 25 mm (0.98 in) thick. The rest of the armour was as follows:

Thickness/slope from the vertical	Front	Side	Rear	Top/Bottom
Turret	25 mm (0.98 in)/10°	15 mm (0.59 in)/14°	15 mm (0.59 in)/15°	8 mm (0.31 in)/81–90°
Superstructure	25 mm (0.98 in)/17°	16 mm (0.63 in)/0°	15 mm (0.59 in)/60°	8 mm (0.31 in)/85–90°
Hull	25 mm (0.98 in)/30°	16 mm (0.63 in)/0°	19 mm (0.75 in)/0°	8 mm (0.31 in)/90°

== Development ==
The Czechoslovak Army formulated a requirement in the II-a category of light cavalry tanks by the end of 1934. Českomoravská Kolben-Daněk proposed an improved version of its P-II light tank already in service as the LT vz. 34, but Škoda offered a new design that used the pneumatic system and engine earlier proved by its unsuccessful SU or S-II light tank prototype. One prototype was ordered from each company for delivery during the summer of 1935. Both tanks had the same armament and three-man crew, but ČKD's P-II-a was much smaller at 8.5 tonnes (8.4 long tons; 9.4 short tons) and had only a maximum 16 millimetres (0.63 in) of armour while Škoda's S-II-a weighed 10.5 tonnes (10.3 long tons; 11.6 short tons) and had 25 millimetres (0.98 in) of armour. The army thought that P-II-a was at the limit of its development while the S-II-a could be improved as needed.

The first production order for 160 LT vz. 35s, as the S-II-a was designated in Army service, was placed on 30 October 1935 and deliveries began in December 1936. An additional order for 35 was made on 12 May 1936 and a follow-on order placed for 103 more a month later. The total order for 298 tanks was split equally by Škoda Works and ČKD according to their cartel agreement.

Development was rushed and there were many defects in the LT vz. 35s. Many tanks had to be returned to the factories to be repaired. Most of these repairs involved the electrical system, not the complicated pneumatic system.

=== Foreign interest ===
In August 1936, Romania placed an order for 126; the bulk of these were delivered from the end of 1938 by Škoda. Afghanistan ordered ten in 1940; but, these were sold instead to Bulgaria. Total production was 434, including 298 for the Czechoslovak Army, 126 for Romania (under the designation Škoda R-2) and ten for Bulgaria. The Wehrmacht used 218 vehicles captured from the Czechoslovak Army in March 1939. Britain's Alvis-Straussler negotiated for a production license from September 1938 until March 1939 when the Nazi occupation made an agreement impossible. The Soviets were also interested so Škoda shipped the S-II-a prototype and one production LT vz. 35 to the proving grounds at Kubinka for evaluation. The Soviets were interested only in buying the prototype, but Škoda refused to sell unless a license was purchased as well, believing that the Soviets would simply copy the design and build it without paying any royalties.

== Variants ==
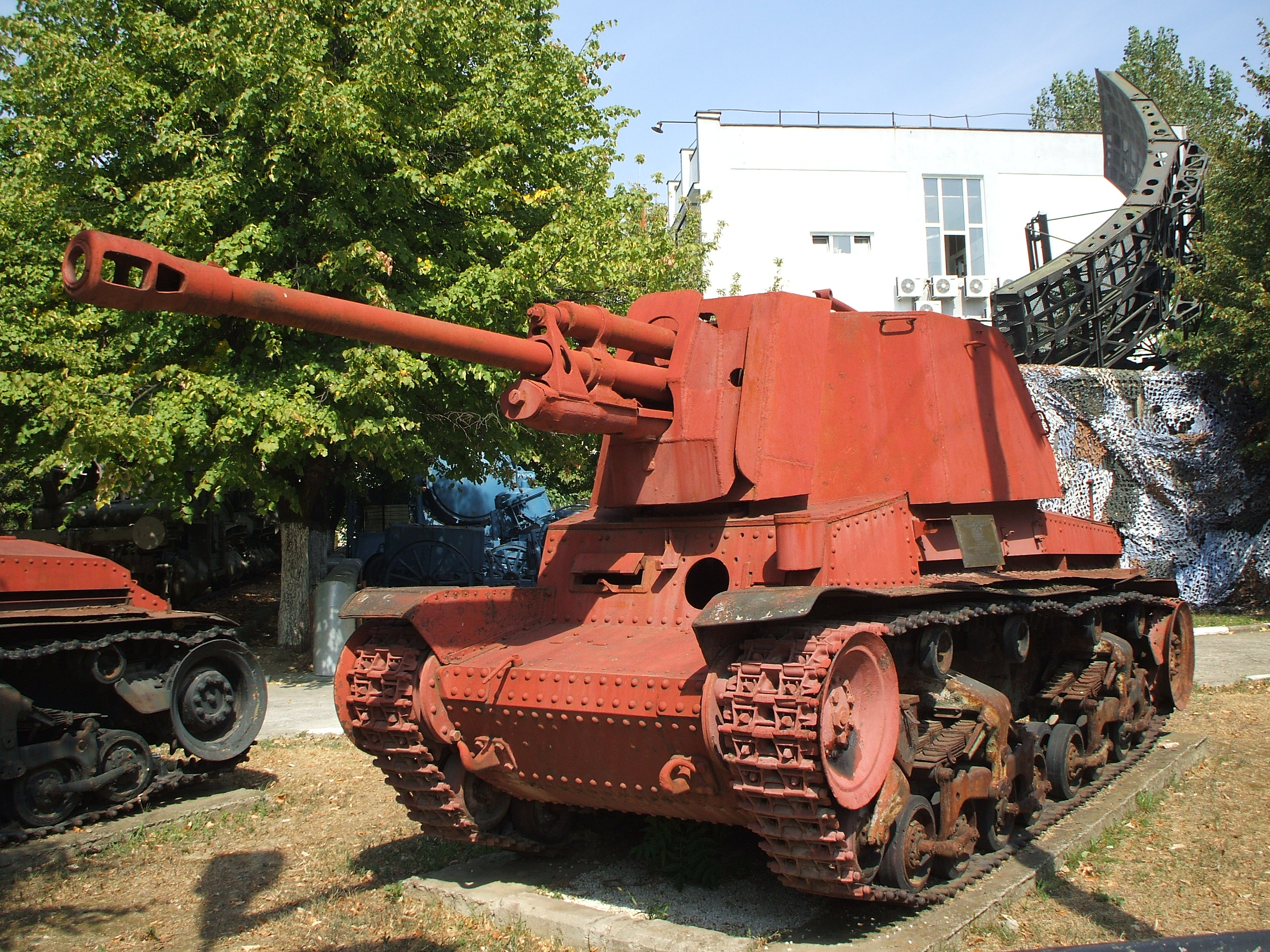
Romanian TACAM R-2 tank destroyer

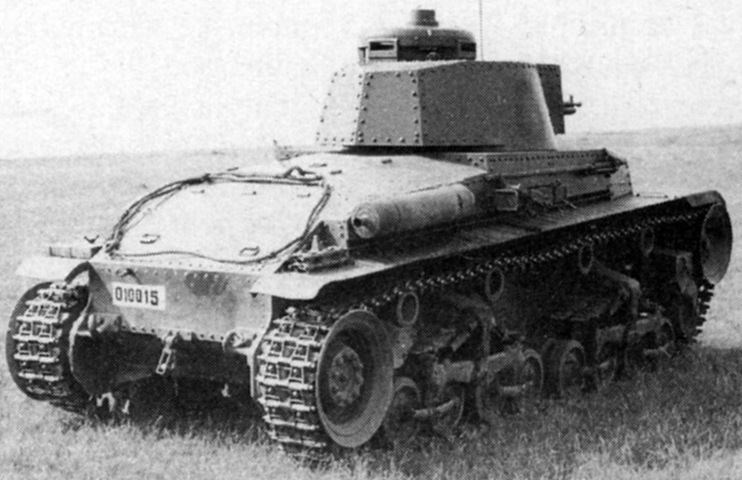
Modified Romanian R-2c variant with different looking rear of both the turret and the hull

=== Czechoslovak ===
- S-IIa – Prototype tank built by Skoda for the Czechoslovak Army S-II light tank requirement
- Lehký tank vzor 35 (Light Tank Model 35) – Abbreviated as LT vz.35 or LT-35, production tanks for the Czechoslovak Army

=== German ===
- Panzerkampfwagen 35(t) – Czechoslovak Army LT vz.35 tanks inducted into the Wehrmacht after annexation.
- Panzerbefehlswagen 35(t) (Pz.Bef.Wg.) – Command tanks with radios.
- Artillerie Schlepper 35(t) – Artillery tractor conversions of Pz.Kpfw. 35(t), also called Mörser Zugmittel 35(t)

=== Romanian ===
- R-2 – Designation used by Romania for LT vz. 35 tanks supplied to the Romanian Army before the Second World War.
- R-2a – Improved R-2 with better engine, radio and improved armor. The Romanians were interested in buying it, but the Germans intervened and did not approve any exports. A proposal to up-armor the R-2 also existed later in Romania.
- R-2c – R-2 tank with different rear for both the turret and hull. The c stands for cimentate ("cemented"), because this version used cemented armor.
- TACAM R-2 – Tank destroyer conversions of R-2 tanks, mounting 76 mm ZiS-3 guns.

=== Others ===
- T-11 – Ten Pz.Kpfw. 35(t) tanks ordered for the Afghan Army in 1940, diverted to Bulgaria. The T-11 was built to an Afghan order placed in 1940 and differed mainly in that it used an improved, longer-barreled Škoda A7 gun (as used on LT vz. 38). Ten were built, but were sold to Bulgaria and delivered in the third quarter of 1940.

== Operational history ==
=== Czechoslovakia ===
The 298 LT vz. 35 tanks were assigned to the armoured regiments belonging to the four Mobile (Rychlá) Divisions between 1936 and 1939. Each regiment was supposed to detach three-tank platoons to support the infantry divisions and border areas in times of crisis. These platoons were heavily used suppressing the protests and violence instigated by Konrad Henlein's Sudeten German Party (Sudetendeutsche Partei - SdP) and the Sudetendeutsche Freikorps (paramilitary groups trained in Germany by SS-instructors) between May and October 1938.

After the Munich Agreement, two tank battalions were sent to reinforce the 3rd Mobile Division in Slovakia. They were used to repel Hungarian and Polish border-crossers, sometimes up to a battalion in strength. They screened the infantry when they had to evacuate southern Slovakia after the First Vienna Award on 2 November 1938.

The S-II-a prototype and one LT vz. 35 tank were returning from testing in the Soviet Union when the fighting began. They detrained in Sevljus and participated in a counterattack at Fančíkovo, but the LT vz. 35 was damaged and captured by the Hungarians. The prototype was forced to retreat into Romania by 17 March, along with most of the other Czech troops in eastern Ruthenia. The Romanians returned the prototype to Škoda six months later.

=== Germany ===
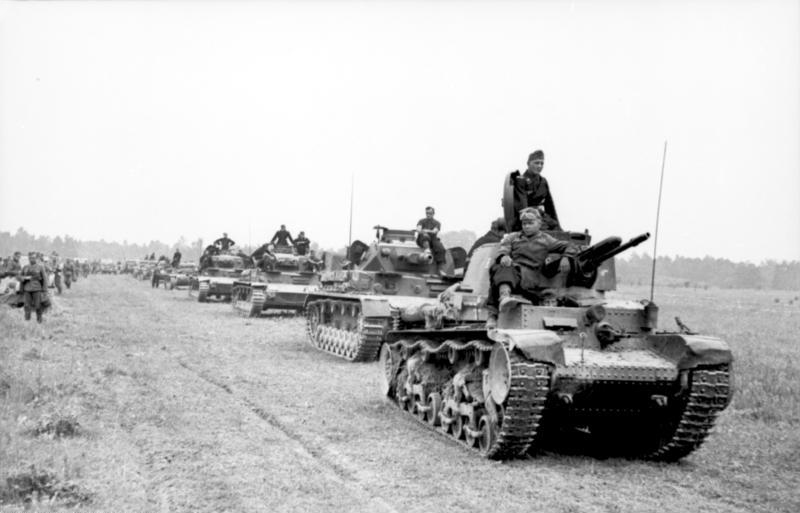
Panzer 35(t) in France, 1940

In 1939, following the German occupation of Czechoslovakia in March 1939, 244 vehicles of the Czechoslovak Army were seized by the Germans where they were known as the L.T.M.35 until January 1940. In German service, they were used as substitutes for the Panzerkampfwagen III medium tank. They were assigned to the Panzer Battalion (Panzerabteilung) 65 (39) of the 1st Light (leichte) Division and the independent Panzer-Regiment 11 (81) where they participated in the invasion of Poland. 77 of these were lost during the campaign, mostly due to mechanical breakdowns, but only 7 of these were irreparable. From 1940 on, there had not been any spare parts available and tanks had to be completely rebuilt to remain operational.

The 1st Light Division absorbed the 11th Panzer Regiment and was redesignated as the 6th Panzer Division on 18 October 1939. It took 132 Pz.Kpfw. 35(t)s into the Battle of France where it was assigned to XXXXI Corps (mot.) for Panzergruppe von Kleist's attack through the Ardennes. 44 of these had been lost by the end of May. 35 replacements were issued on 3 June in preparation for Fall Rot, the attack on the remnants of the French Army that began the following day. A total of 62 Pz.Kpfw. 35(t)s were either total write-offs or were damaged beyond the ability of the field maintenance workshops to repair during the campaign.

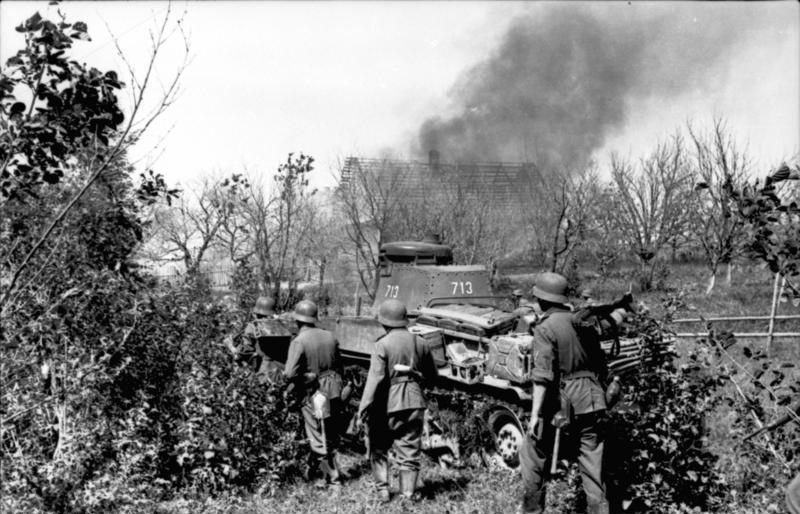
PzKpfw 35(t) in the USSR

For the invasion of the Soviet Union, 6th Panzer Division had 160 Pz.Kpfw. 35(t)s. to support 4th Panzer Group's drive on Leningrad. By 10 September 1941, the division had only 102 operational Pz.Kpfw. 35(t), despite having received two replacements from Germany. Eight tanks were repairable, but 47 were total losses. By 31 October, only 34 were operational with another 41 requiring repair. On 30 November, all Pz.Kpfw. 35(t)s were reported non-operational.

The average distance driven is 12,500 kilometres (7,800 mi) for the Pz.Kpfw. 35(t). The special situation in regard to repair the Pz.Kpfw. 35(t) is well known. It is indeed deemed necessary to point out that repairs can only be accomplished by cannibalizing other Panzers because there are no longer any spare parts for the Pz.Kpfw. 35(t). This means that after retrieval of the Panzers that are scattered around the terrain, a maximum of 10 can actually be repaired out of the 41 Pz.Kpfw. 35(t) reported as needing repair. The Pz.Kpfw. 35(t) can no longer be rebuilt. All of the components are worn out. To be practical, maybe the armored hulls are still useable.

— Commander, 6th Panzer Division, 31 October 1941

Due to the cessation of production of these tanks, and the absence of spare parts being made, it was decided that the summer campaign of 1941 was to be their last. The fighting in the Soviet Union exposed the vehicle's unsuitability for cold weather operations and general unreliability. This weakness, in addition to their thin armour and inadequate firepower, resulted in the 6th Panzer Division being reequipped with German tanks on its withdrawal from the Soviet Union in April 1942. All 26 remaining Pz.Kpfw. 35(t)s still in working condition in 1942 were sold to Romania. Some vehicles had their turrets and hull machine guns removed so that the chassis could serve as a munition carrier or an artillery tractor, the Artillerie Schlepper and the Mörserzugmittel 35(t). These had a towing capacity of 12 tonnes (12 long tons; 13 short tons).

=== Romania ===
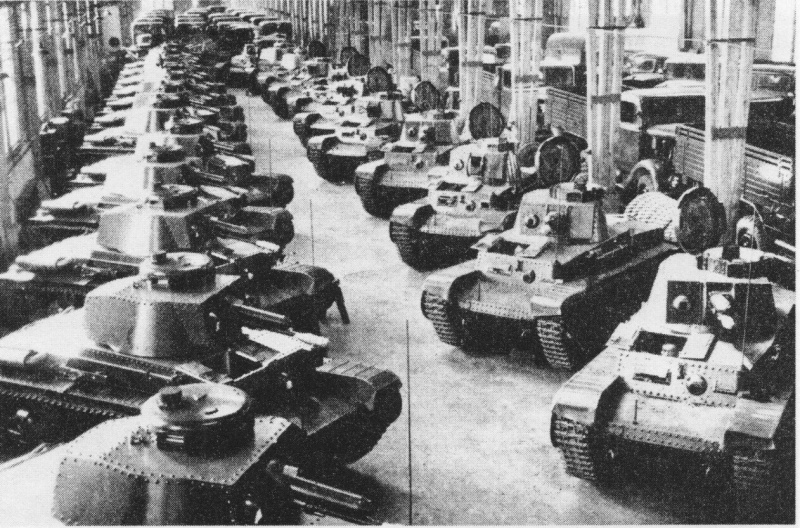
R-2 tanks in February 1939, before being delivered to Romania by Škoda Works

Romania ordered 126 of the tanks on 14 August 1936 as the R-2 and received the first 15, which had been diverted from the Czech order, in April–May 1937 to display in a parade. They suffered from numerous teething problems and the Romanians put a hold on production until these issues were resolved. The constantly changing Romanian demands did not help the situation, but they refused to accept any vehicles until trials were conducted in Romania. Three R-2s were shipped to Romania on 12 July 1938 for the trials, but Skoda knew which one would be chosen and prepared the vehicle well and it passed all tests. After disassembly and checks of the trial tank were completed, the Romanian commission approved the design on 23 August. In the meantime, the initial batch was returned to Skoda to be upgraded to current standards on 28 July. Shipments to Romania began on 1 September with 27 shipped before the Munich Crisis forced the Czechs to hold all remaining tanks in case they were needed. 5 finished tanks and six almost-finished tanks were appropriated and shipped to Slovakia although they were quickly returned after the Munich Agreement was signed. The last shipment departed on 22 February 1939.

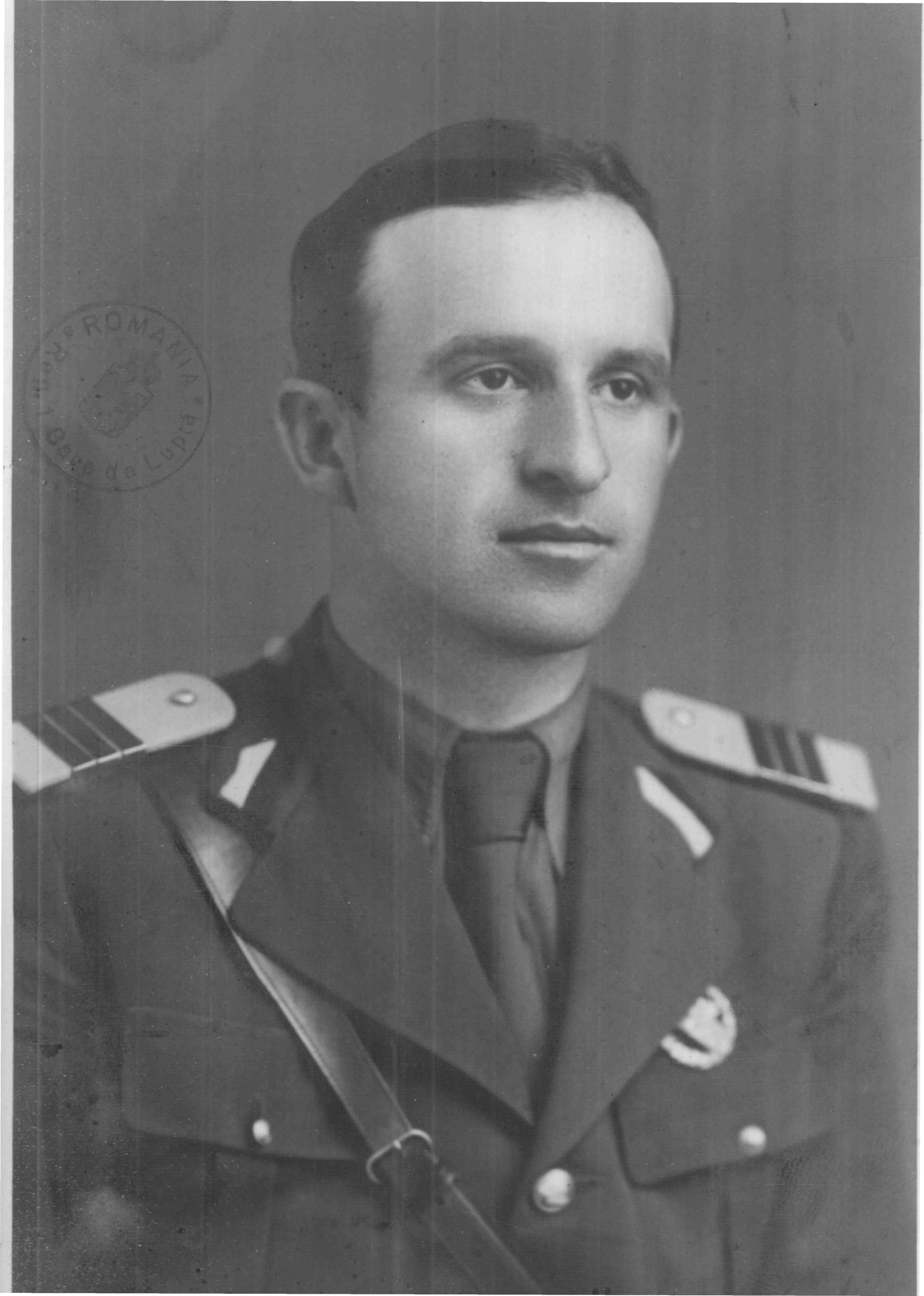
Commander of the 5th Company of the 1st Tank Regiment: Captain Napoleon Alexandru Popescu, in 1940

The first combat use of the R-2 was in the summer of 1940 on 2 July, in the midst of the forced occupation of Bessarabia and Northern Bukovina by the Soviet Union. A tank company, the 5th, from the 2nd Battalion of the 1st Tank Regiment, under the command of captain Napoleon Popescu, held the bridgehead over the River Prut between Galați and Giurgiulești, on the latter's side. They clashed with a Soviet armored column of 70 vehicles, which resulted in 3 tankettes and 1 T-40 amphibious light tank destroyed for the Soviets and no losses for the Romanians. This resistance allowed other Romanian units, civilians, and refugees to cross the Prut into friendly territory before the bridge was blown by a pioneer unit. The R-2 was also used during the Legionnaires' Rebellion in January 1941 to stop the Legionnaires.

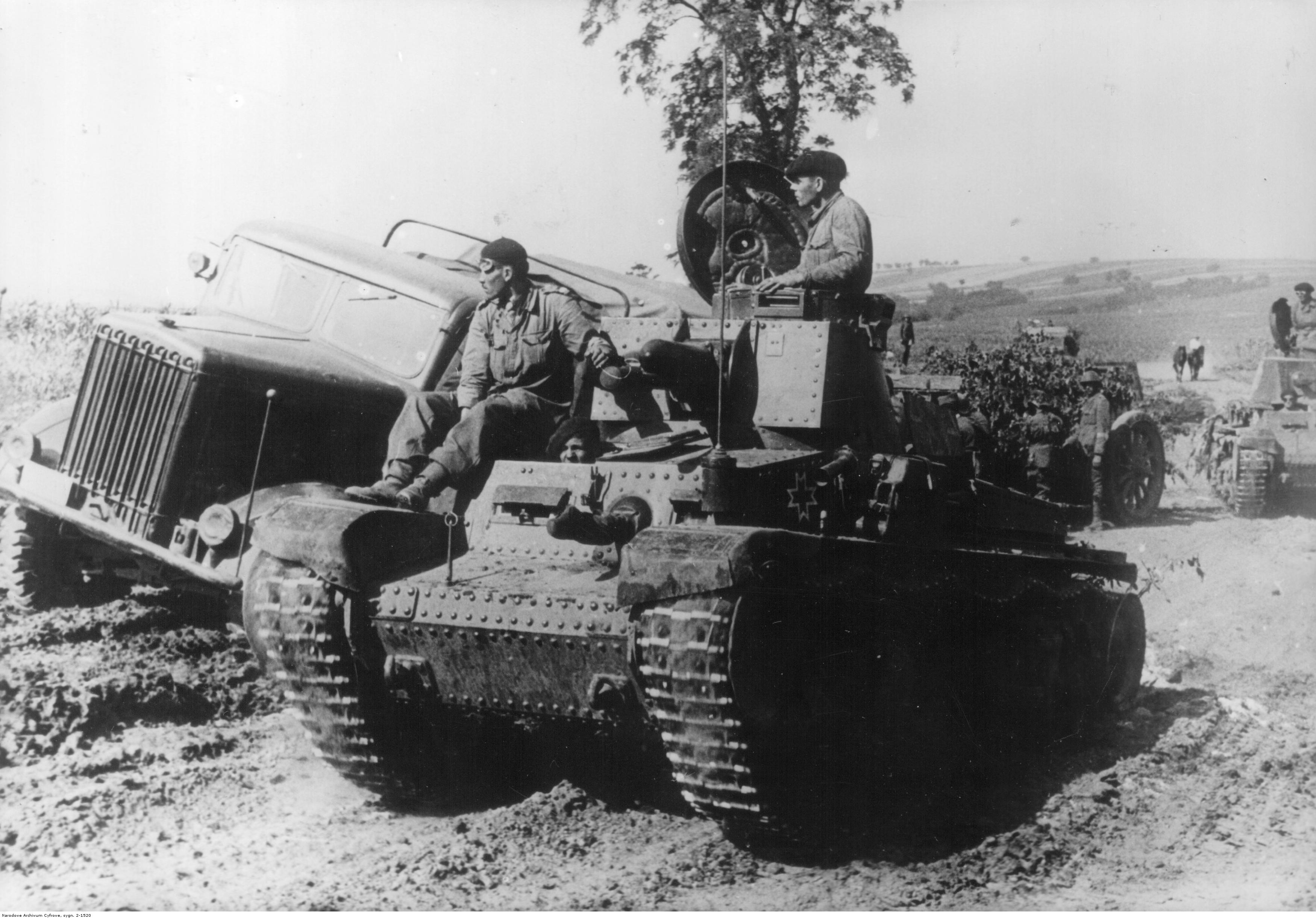
Romanian R-2 tanks near Chișinău in 1941.

The R-2s were assigned to the 1st Tank Regiment of the 1st Armoured Division where they participated in Operation Barbarossa. The division was withdrawn from combat after the Battle of Odessa in October 1941. At the start of 1942, 40 tanks were sent to Pilsen for overhaul while 50 more were repaired in Ploiești. The division returned to the front on 29 August 1942 with 109 R-2s. By the eve of the Soviet Stalingrad Counter-offensive on 19 November the division could only muster 84 serviceable R-2s with as many as 37 unserviceable tanks stationed in the rear. The division was on the outer edges of the Stalingrad Pocket, but managed to break through the western wing of the encirclement, although 77 R-2s were lost in the process. Only about a third of these were destroyed by the Soviets, the rest were either abandoned or broke down and could not be recovered. One R-2 arrived from Romania during December as a reinforcement. The 1st Armored Division was ordered home in early January 1943.

Despite the delivery of 26 Pz.Kpfw. 35(t)s during 1942, Romania could only muster 59 R-2/Pz.Kpfw. 35(t)s on 1 April and 30 August 1943, but raised this to 63 by 25 March 1944. There were 44 on hand on 19 July 1944. By this time they were relegated to training duties with the 1st Training Armoured Division. A company of R-2s was sent to Transnistria with the ad-hoc Cantemir Mixed Tank Group on 24 February 1944, but it did not see combat before being withdrawn on 28 March 1944.

A company of R-2s was assigned to the Popescu Armoured Detachment after King Michael's Coup and Romanian's defection from the Axis at the end of August 1944. The Detachment was tasked with preventing the German units stationed around Ploiești from breaking out to the north and finding refuge in Hungary. They accomplished their task and the R-2s were withdrawn from combat operations until the following year. Romania had concentrated all of its remaining tanks and armoured fighting vehicles in the 2nd Armoured Regiment in early 1945 as the unofficial Soviet arms embargo began to have effect. It had five R-2s on hand in early February 1945 when it was sent to the front, but the Soviets confiscated most of them when it arrived. Both R-2s were serviceable when the regiment entered Bratislava on 4 April 1945, but these were probably destroyed when the regiment was nearly surrounded in Austria on 10 April because they are no longer listed among the regiment's vehicles afterwards.

Twenty-one tanks were rebuilt as TACAM R-2 tank destroyers with an ex-Soviet 76.2 mm gun in 1943–44.

=== Slovakia ===
The Slovak Army seized 52 LT vz. 35 tanks when they declared their independence from Czechoslovakia in March 1939. They were organized into a battalion that was later incorporated into the Armoured Regiment. They received LT-35 designation in Slovak Army. Three of these tanks participated in the Slovak-Hungarian War of March 1939. One tank company participated in the invasion of Poland, but did not see any fighting. The Army upgraded the internal communications system of its tanks with German intercoms in 1941, but it is unknown if they added a fourth crewman as did the Germans. When Slovakia joined the German invasion of the Soviet Union it sent a Mobile Group that included thirty LT vz. 35s. The Mobile Group was reinforced and reorganized in early July 1941 as the Mobile Brigade, also known as Brigade Pilfousek after its commander, and it mustered only twenty-seven tanks despite seven reinforcements because breakdowns had caused ten to be evacuated back to Slovakia. This was due to a conspiracy among the Slovak tankers that the tanks would be needed to overthrow the regime at some point and could not be wasted in combat against the Soviets. This caused a high incidence of crew sabotage to which the officers and maintainers turned a blind eye, which caused the tanks to be withdrawn to Slovakia at the beginning of August 1941. On 1 January 1942, the Slovaks had 49 LT vz. 35 on hand because three had been destroyed in the battle for Lipovec earlier in the summer. However, of these 49 only seven were operational as part of the conspiracy to keep the tanks in Slovakia. The LT vz. 35s were relegated to the training/reserve role by 1943 when the Germans began to supply more modern tanks to Slovakia. At least eight LT vz. 35s were used by the insurgents during the Slovak National Uprising in 1944.

Slovak insurgents used LT vz. 35 tanks also in its 3 armored trains. Not only turrets, but whole tanks were used, when they placed tank on flat wagon, and then built armored walls around it. One LT vz. 35 is preserved until today, inside of original armored tank car from Armored Train Štefánik, which is displayed in the Museum of Slovak National Uprising in Banská Bystrica.

=== Bulgaria ===
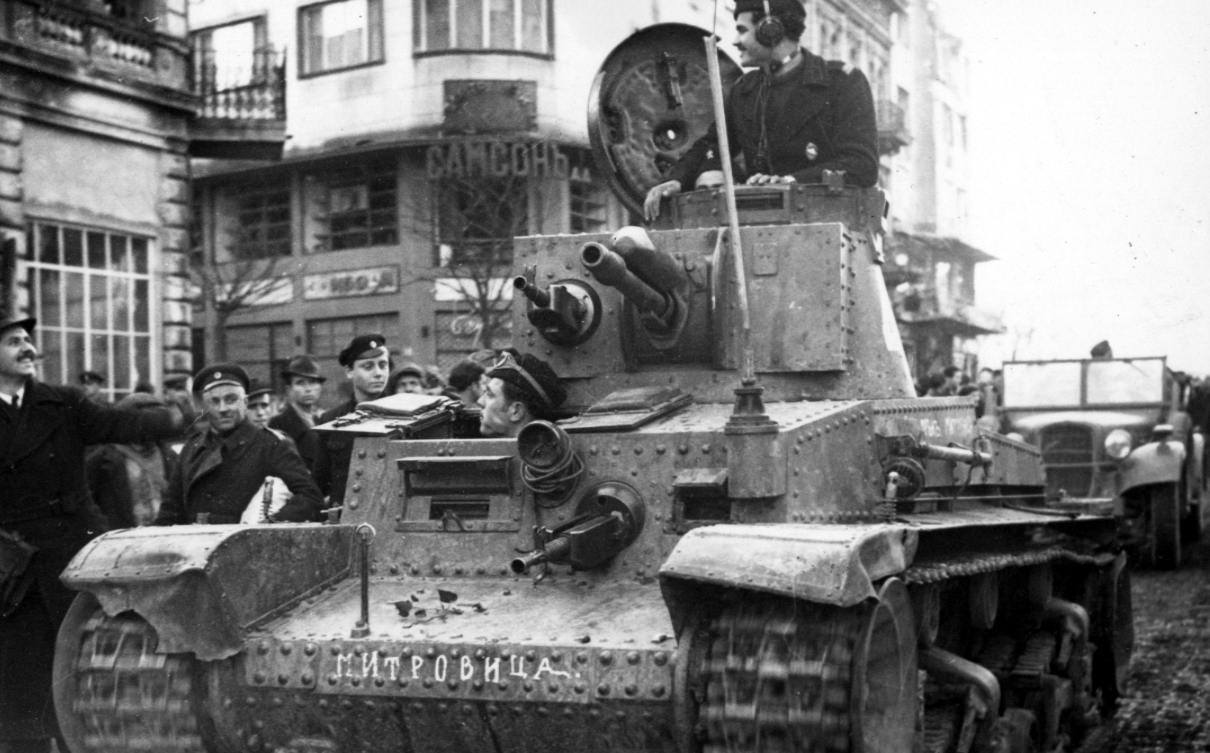
Bulgarian T-11 with A-3 gun in Sofia, December 1944

Bulgaria used 26 tanks, delivered by Germany from used war reserve stock in early 1940, with the normal A-3 gun and 10 new T-11 tanks with the more powerful A-7 gun from the confiscated Afghan order were delivered between August and October 1940. They equipped the 1st and 2nd companies of the Bulgarian armored regiment in June 1941. They were supposedly relegated to training duties once the Germans began to deliver the Panzerkampfwagen IV medium tanks in 1944, but apparently remained in service into the Fifties. But Kliment and Francev claim that the T-11s participated in the fighting in Yugoslavia and ended the war south of Vienna as part of the 1st Tank Brigade.

=== Hungary ===
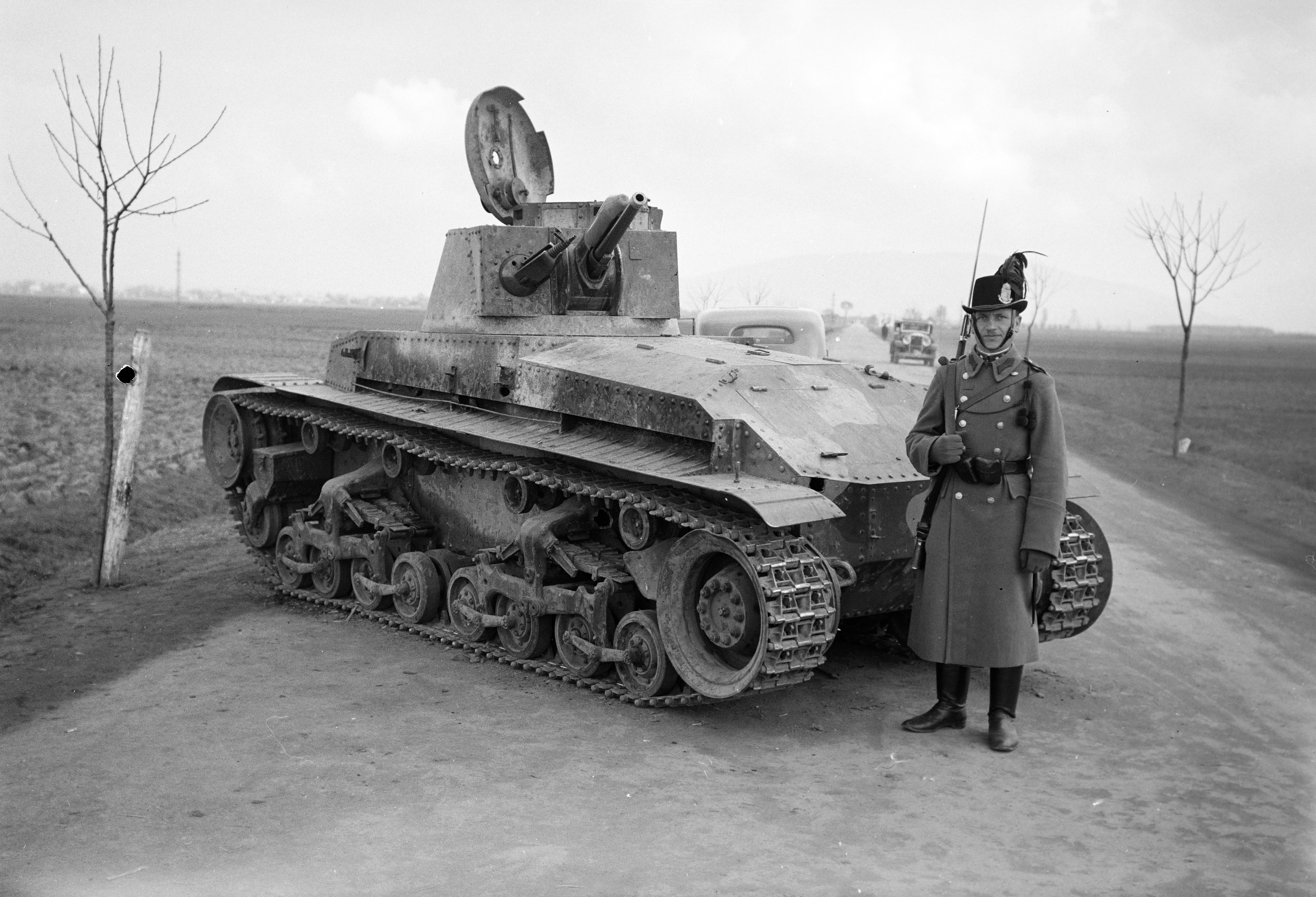
LT vz. 35 captured in Carpatho-Ukraine by Hungarian army

Hungary captured one LT vz. 34 in Carpatho-Ukraine on 15 March 1939, when it conquered that country, and also a LT vz. 35 in fighting with the Czech demonstration detachment returning from Kubinka in med-March 1939. They were impressed and asked Škoda for a quote to repair them. The Hungarians did not accept the price, but Škoda fixed them for free once the Hungarians had bought a license to build the Škoda T-21 medium tank in August 1940. The tanks were returned to Hungary in March 1941 and were used for training through 1943.

== See also ==
- Weapons of Czechoslovakia interwar period

Related development

- LT vz. 34
- Panzer 38(t)
