= List of traction motor manufacturers =

Traction motor manufacturers include:

Manufacturer	Notes	Links
ABB		
Aisin AW		
Alstom		
ATB-SEVER	Electric machines and drive systems, asynchronous and DC motors for traction, and synchronous traction generators	
Bharat Heavy Electricals		
Bombardier	Traction drives	
CG Power & Industrial Solutions	Traction, Propulsion, Locomotive, Trainset, Electric Multiple Unit, Tower Car, Control Cubicle, Signalling Relays, Point machine, LOCO electrics, Converter,	
CRRC		
Electro-Motive Diesel		
GEC Traction	Merged with Alstom in 1989. Was a subsidiary of General Electric.	
GE Transportation		
Kawasaki		
Končar		
Mitsubishi		
Power Machines	Electrosila plant	
Ransomes, Sims & Jefferies		
Rosenergomash		
Rotem		
Ruf Automobile	Alois Ruf	
Sibelektroprivod
Siemens Mobility		
Škoda Transportation		
Toshiba		
Traktionssysteme Austria	Vienna (Wiener Neudorf), Austria	
