= Škoda Works =

European industrial conglomerate

Škoda, a.s.

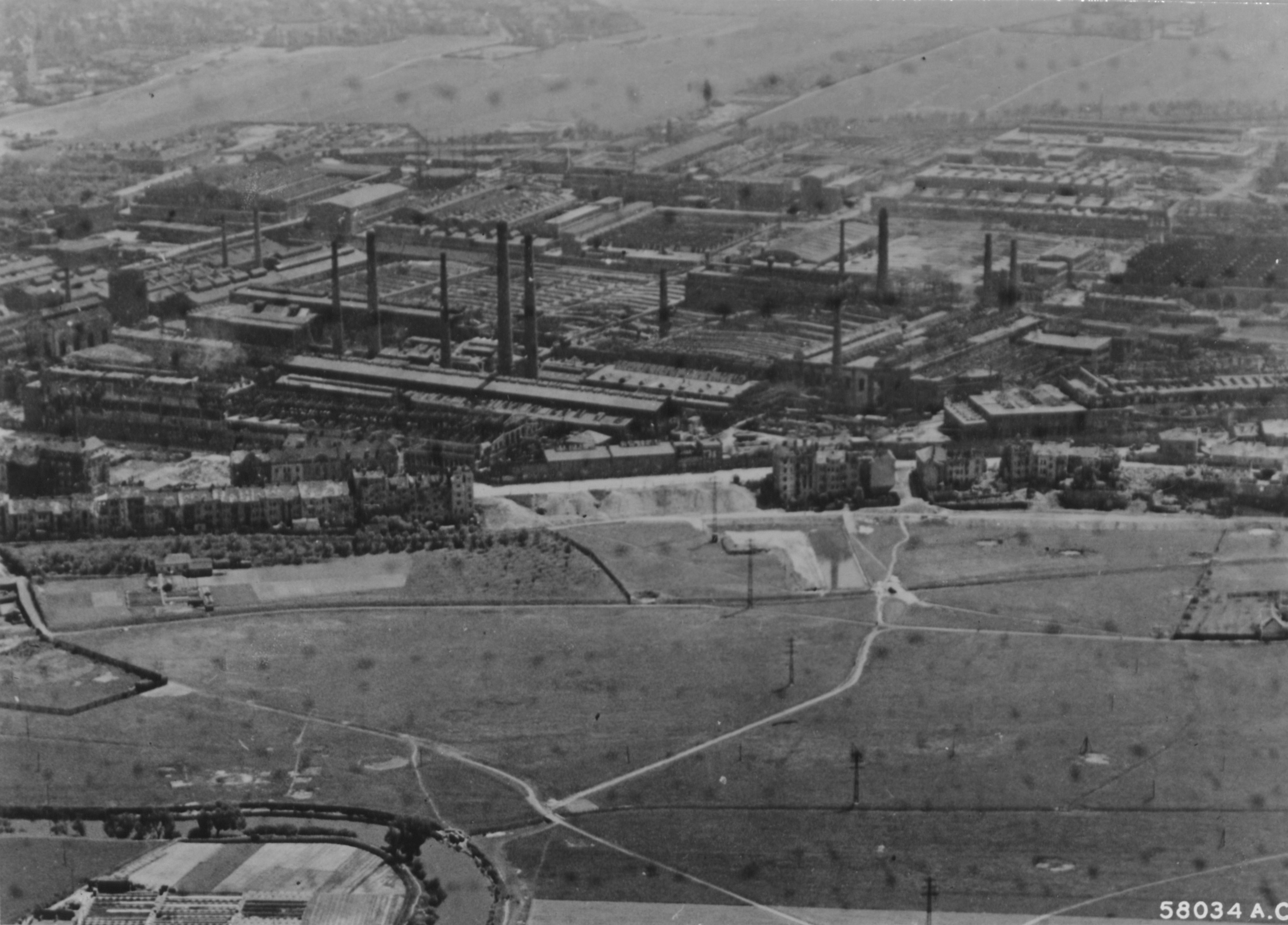
- Type: Private
- Industry: Conglomerates
- Founded: Plzeň, Kingdom of Bohemia, Austrian Empire (1859)
- Founder: Emil Škoda
- Defunct: 1999
- Fate: Divided
- Successor: Doosan Škoda Power; LIAZ; Pilsen Steel; Škoda Auto; Škoda JS; Škoda Transportation
- Headquarters: Plzeň, Czech Republic
- Area served: Worldwide
- Products: Locomotives, aircraft, ships, machine tools, steam turbines, guns, trolleybuses and trams
- Revenue: 16,500,000,000 Czech koruna (1994)
- Net income: 878,269,000 Czech koruna (2000)
- Number of employees: 34,231 (1991)
- Parent: Reichswerke AG für Waffen-und Maschinenbau Hermann Göring

The Škoda Works (Czech: Škodovy závody) was an engineering and armaments group based in Plzeň in present-day Czech Republic. It originated a foundry and machine factory established in 1859 and bought by engineer Emil Škoda in 1869. The factory initially made machinery for breweries and sugar factories. Škoda opened a new steelworks in 1886 and the company then began making armaments.

By the First World War, Škoda was Austria-Hungary's largest arms manufacturer. It supplied artillery to the army and heavy guns for warships. After 1918, Škoda began building locomotives and machinery for civilian use. In 1925, it acquired the Mladá Boleslav carmaker Laurin & Klement.

During the German occupation of Czechoslovakia, the works became part of Reichswerke Hermann Göring and it had to produce armaments for Germany.

The Czechoslovak state nationalised Škoda in 1945. Some of Škoda’s factories became independent enterprises and the car works in Mladá Boleslav became AZNP, the predecessor of Škoda Auto. Locomotives, turbines and trolleybuses remained important products of the Plzeň works, which also began making equipment for nuclear power stations. Most of its production went to the Soviet Union, Poland and East Germany.

Demand from former Eastern Bloc countries fell sharply in the early 1990s, just when Škoda was privatised. Financial situation led to restructuring and the sale of individual businesses. Several former Škoda businesses remain active in Plzeň, among them Škoda Transportation, Doosan Škoda Power and Škoda JS.

== History ==
=== 1859–1899: establishment ===
In 1859, Count Ernst von Waldstein-Wartenberg established an engineering works in Plzeň as a branch of his ironworks at Sedlec near Starý Plzenec. The factory began operating in September 1860. It manufactured and repaired industrial machinery, supplying equipment for breweries, sugar factories, mills and mines, as well as steam engines and boilers. In 1861, Plzeň’s Bürgerliches Brauhaus ordered two steam engines and two coolers from the works.

Emil Škoda joined the factory as chief engineer in 1866 and bought it from Waldstein on 12 June 1869. He expanded its production facilities and developed its export business. In 1876, the company opened a representative office in Kyiv, led by sugar industry specialist Hugo Jelínek, to support its supplies of machinery to breweries and sugar factories in the Russian Empire.

Between 1884 and 1886, Škoda built a steelworks producing cast steel, which attracted orders from foreign naval authorities. The company subsequently expanded into armaments, completing its first naval gun in 1889 and opening a separate armaments department in 1890.

Expansion placed increasing demands on the company’s finances. In December 1899, the business was converted into a joint-stock company with the participation of Creditanstalt and the Bohemian Escomptebank. Emil Škoda retained a majority shareholding and became its president and general director.

=== 1900–1918: expansion and World War I ===
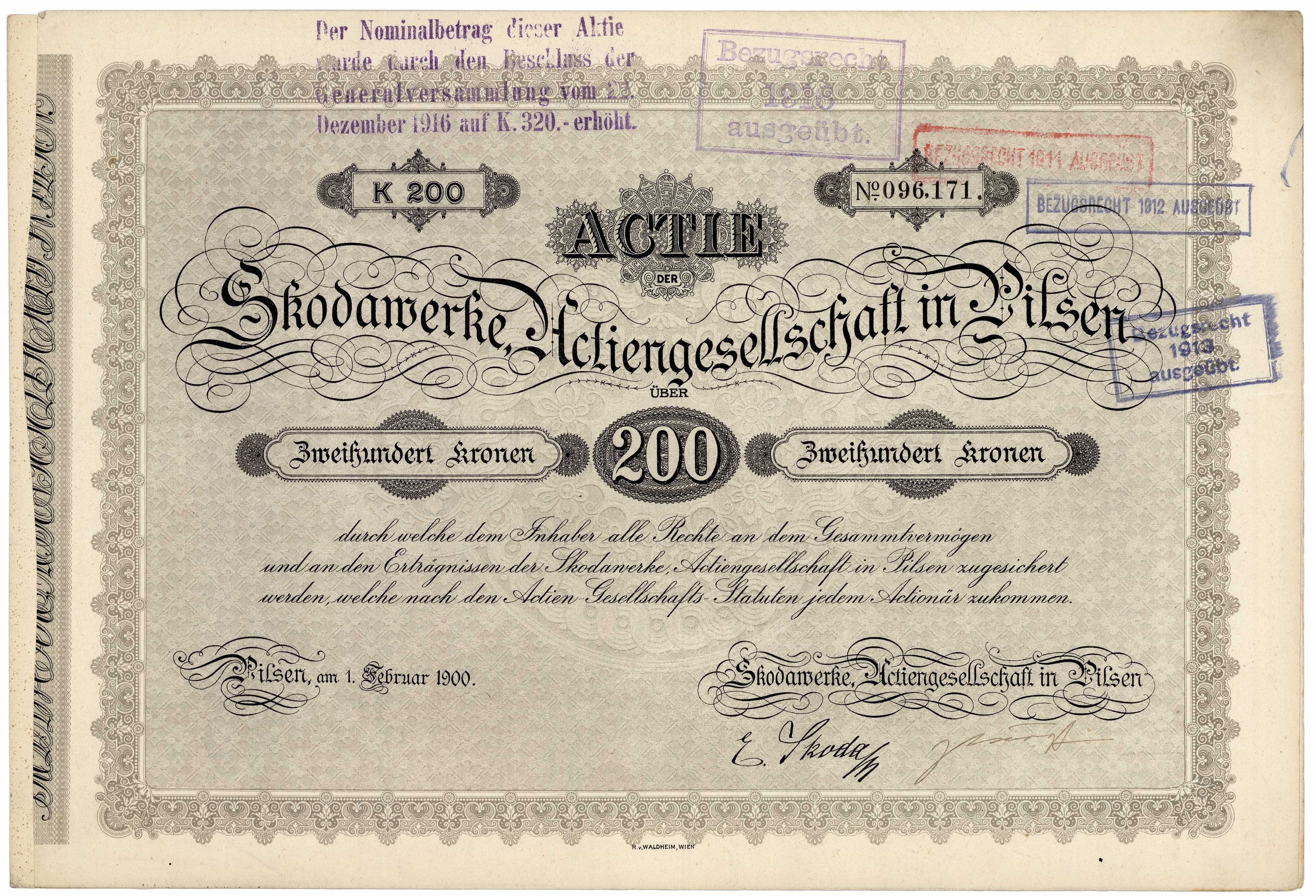
Share of the Škodawerke AG, issued in 1900

Karl Škoda inherited his father’s majority stake in the company in 1900. He became general director in 1909, taking over from Georg Günther, who had held the post since 1904. During Günther’s time as general director, the Austro-Hungarian army placed substantial orders with Škoda.

Civilian production continued, with steam turbines added in 1904 under a licence from the French engineer Auguste Rateau. Škoda opened a research institute in 1907 and began manufacturing turbines to its own designs in 1911. The institute’s chemical, metallographic and mechanical laboratories worked on engineering tasks in steelmaking and arms manufacture.

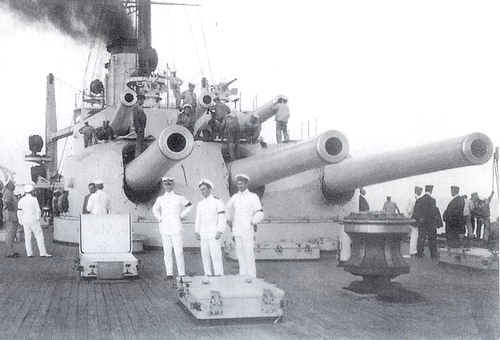
Škoda-built naval guns aboard the Austro-Hungarian battleship

Škoda also supplied penstocks for the Canadian Niagara Power Company’s hydroelectric plant at Niagara Falls.

By the outbreak of World War I, Škoda was the largest arms manufacturer in Austria-Hungary, supplying guns and ammunition to both the army and navy. It made the guns and turrets for the navy’s Tegetthoff-class battleships, each of which carried twelve 30.5 cm guns. Škoda also produced mountain guns and siege artillery.

In 1913, Škoda took part in founding Magyar Ágyúgyár, the Hungarian gun company with a factory at Győr. The Hungarian state was the majority shareholder and production started in 1916.

The company enlarged its workshops to meet military orders. The workforce grew to more than 30,000 during 1917. Women entered jobs previously held largely by men. The works operated under military supervision, with restrictions on workers’ freedom to leave their employment.

=== 1918–1938: restructuring and diversification ===
František Hanuš became general director in 1918. Škoda needed money to adapt its factories for civilian production, but had debts to its banks and unpaid claims against the former Austro-Hungarian state.

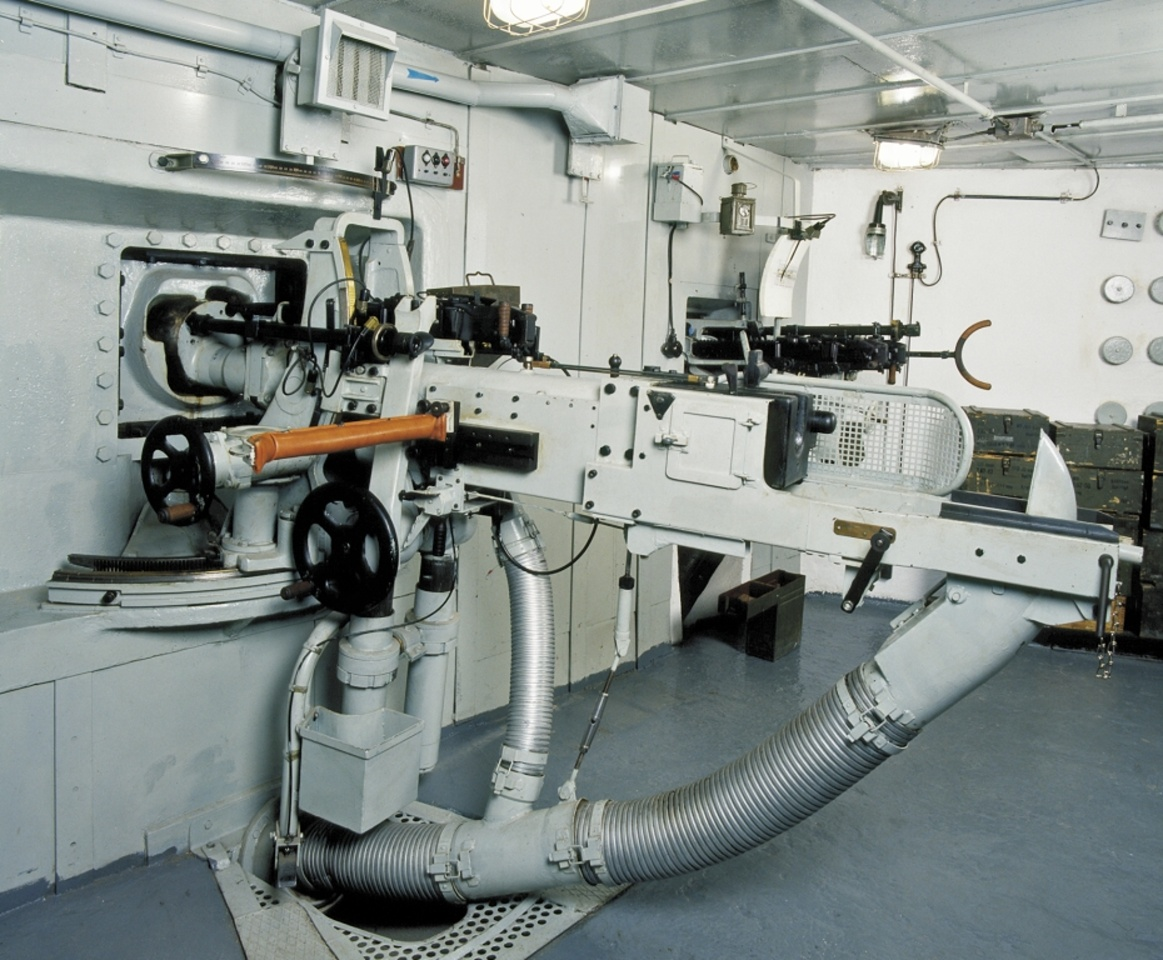
A Škoda fortress gun in the MO-S 19 infantry casemate

With the backing of the Czechoslovak government, Schneider et Cie acquired a controlling interest in Škoda in 1919. The French company’s investment helped finance the change to peacetime production. Škoda moved its headquarters from Vienna to Prague and, in 1921, merged with Spojené strojírny. The merger brought back the engineering operations transferred in 1914 and added factories in Prague-Smíchov and Hradec Králové.

Locomotive production began with a steam engine delivered on 11 June 1920. In 1922, Škoda hired twelve specialists from Switzerland to help develop electric locomotives. Two years later, the company set up an electric-railway department at its Doudlevce factory. The first electric locomotive was completed in May 1927 for service between Prague’s railway stations.

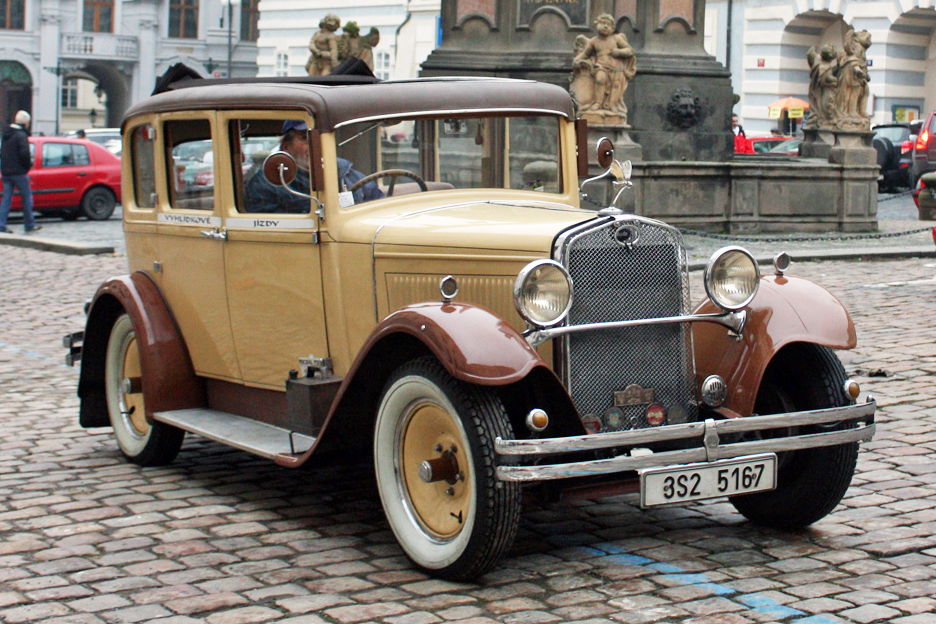
A Škoda 422

Škoda established an automotive department in 1919, initially manufacturing military vehicles. It then manufactured Sentinel lorries and Hispano-Suiza luxury cars under licence. Karel Loevenstein became a new general director in 1923, the year Škoda registered its winged-arrow trademark. Two years later, the company acquired Laurin & Klement in Mladá Boleslav. In 1930, its automotive operations were reorganised into a subsidiary, Akciová společnost pro automobilový průmysl (ASAP). This combined the Mladá Boleslav factory, the Plzeň automotive department, and the repair network.

Sales fell during the Great Depression, and Škoda cut its workforce. Financial assistance in 1932 helped it through the crisis. Orders from the Czechoslovak army and foreign customers supported a recovery from 1934.

In 1933, Škoda secured an Iranian government order to equip six sugar factories. Further orders covered the construction of factory buildings. Škoda arranged transport, installed the machinery and helped put the factories into operation. It established Société Iranienne Skoda in Tehran that December to handle its Iranian business.

After the Munich Agreement, Schneider sold its shares in Škoda to Czechoslovak interests in December 1938. The French directors resigned in January 1939, and the Artillery Convention ended that month.

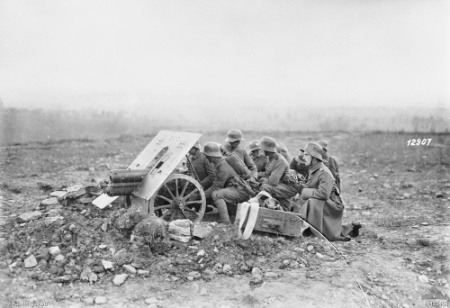
Škoda 75 mm Model 15

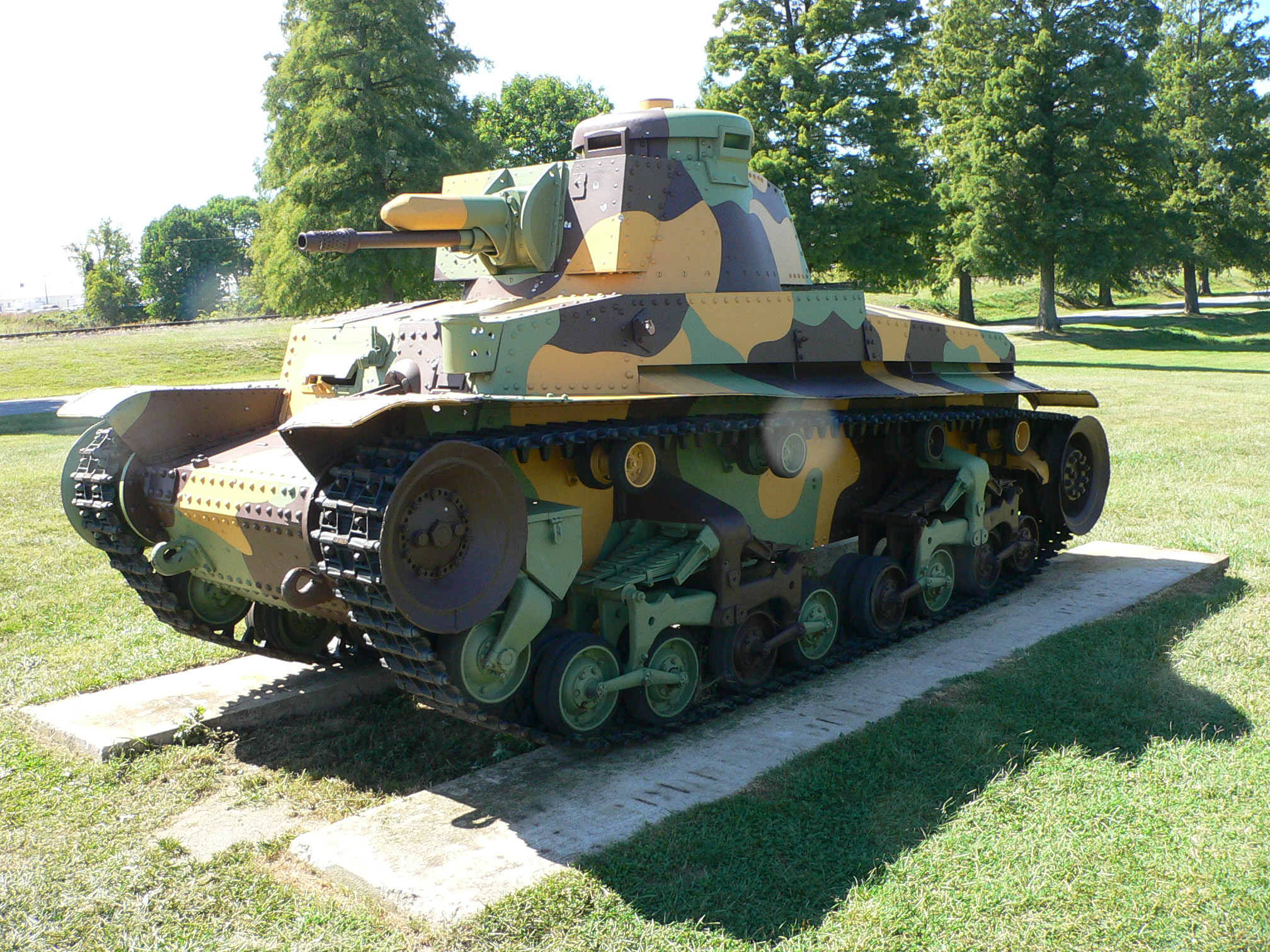
Panzer 35(t) tank

=== 1939–1945: German control and World War II ===
After the German occupation started in March 1939, Škoda was placed under military administration. A German delegation arranged the takeover of its management on 20 March. Reichswerke Hermann Göring took control of Škoda through share purchases and voting agreements. From 1942, Waffen-Union Škoda-Brünn managed the German shareholdings in Škoda and the Brno arms works. Wilhelm Voss headed the holding company. Before the war, Škoda produced LT vz. 35 light tanks for the Czechoslovak Army. After the occupation, the German army took over these tanks and used them under the designation Panzer 35(t).

Guns and ammunition remained the main products of the Plzeň works, which manufactured weapons to both Škoda and German designs for the German armed forces. The special-vehicle department repaired tanks and made half-track chassis before returning to the manufacture of complete armoured vehicles in August 1944. It delivered 766 Hetzer tank destroyers before the end of the war.

The factories expanded to meet military orders and employment rose from about 40,000 in 1939 to more than 55,000 in 1942. The company also used forced labour and opened labour “re-education” camps. Prisoners escaped from these camps during the air raid of 25 April 1945.

Škoda’s physics research department continued working after the Czech universities closed in 1939. It moved from university premises to a company building in Prague-Smíchov and then to Příbram. Václav Dolejšek continued working with its researchers after the universities closed in 1939. He also joined the resistance. The Gestapo arrested him in October 1944. He died at the Small Fortress in Terezín on 3 January 1945.

On 25 April 1945, American bombers attacked the Plzeň works, which were still producing arms. The BBC had warned workers to leave the factory before the raid. About 70 per cent of the factory was destroyed or seriously damaged in the raid. American troops liberated Plzeň on 6 May, and the first postwar locomotives left the works that autumn.

Mountain guns produced by Škoda

- Škoda 75 mm Model 15
- Škoda 75 mm Model 1928
- Škoda 75 mm Model 1936
- Škoda 75 mm Model 1939
- Škoda 100 mm Model 1916
- Škoda 100 mm Model 16/19
- Škoda 105 mm Model 1939
- Škoda 150 mm Model 1918

Other weapons produced by Škoda

- Škoda M1909 machine gun
- 3,7cm KPÚV vz. 34 – anti-tank gun
- 3,7cm KPÚV vz. 37 – anti-tank gun
- 3,7cm ÚV vz. 38 (A7) – used on LT vz. 38 light tank
- Škoda 47mm SFK L/33 H
- Škoda 47mm SFK L/44 S
- 4.7 cm KPÚV vz. 38
- Škoda 7 cm K10
- Škoda 7.5 cm d/29 Model 1911
- Škoda 76.5 mm L/50
- Škoda 10 cm K10
- Škoda 10 cm vz. 38 howitzer
- 85 mm vz. 52
- Škoda 10 cm vz. 53
- Škoda 14 cm/56
- Škoda 15 cm K10
- Škoda 149 mm K-series
  - Škoda 149 mm K1 / Model 1933
  - Škoda 149 mm K4 / Model 1937
- Škoda 19 cm vz. 1904
- 21 cm Kanone 39
- 210 mm gun M1939 (Br-17)
- 24 cm Haubitze 39
- Škoda 24 cm L/40 K97
- Škoda 305 mm Model 1911
- Škoda 30.5 cm /45 K10
- 305 mm howitzer M1939 (Br-18)
- 35 cm Marinekanone L/45 M. 16
- 42 cm Haubitze M. 14/16

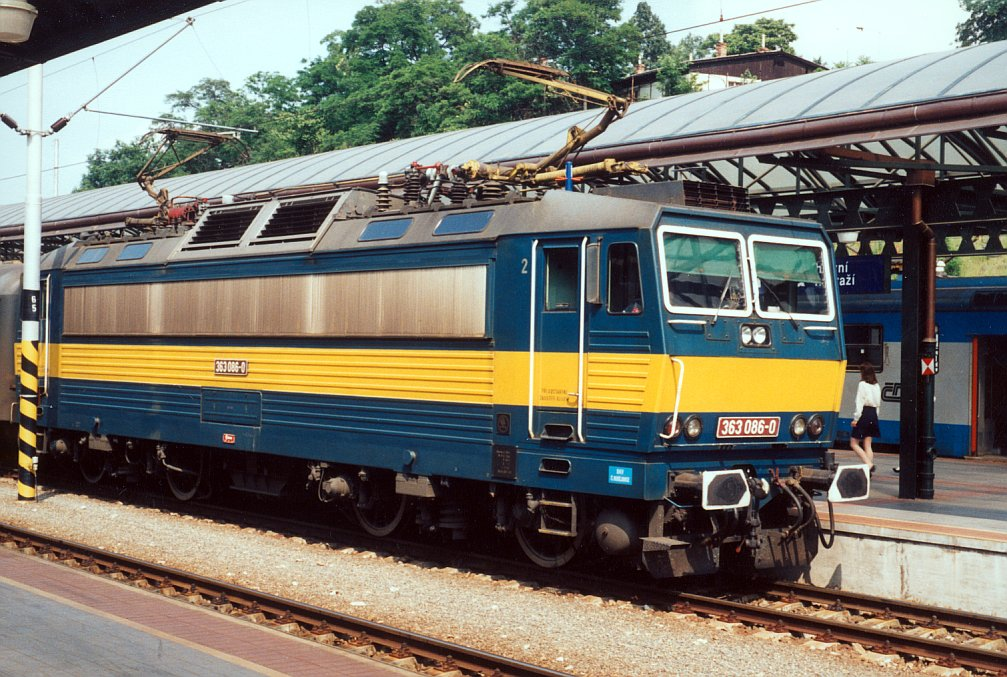
ES499.1 locomotive

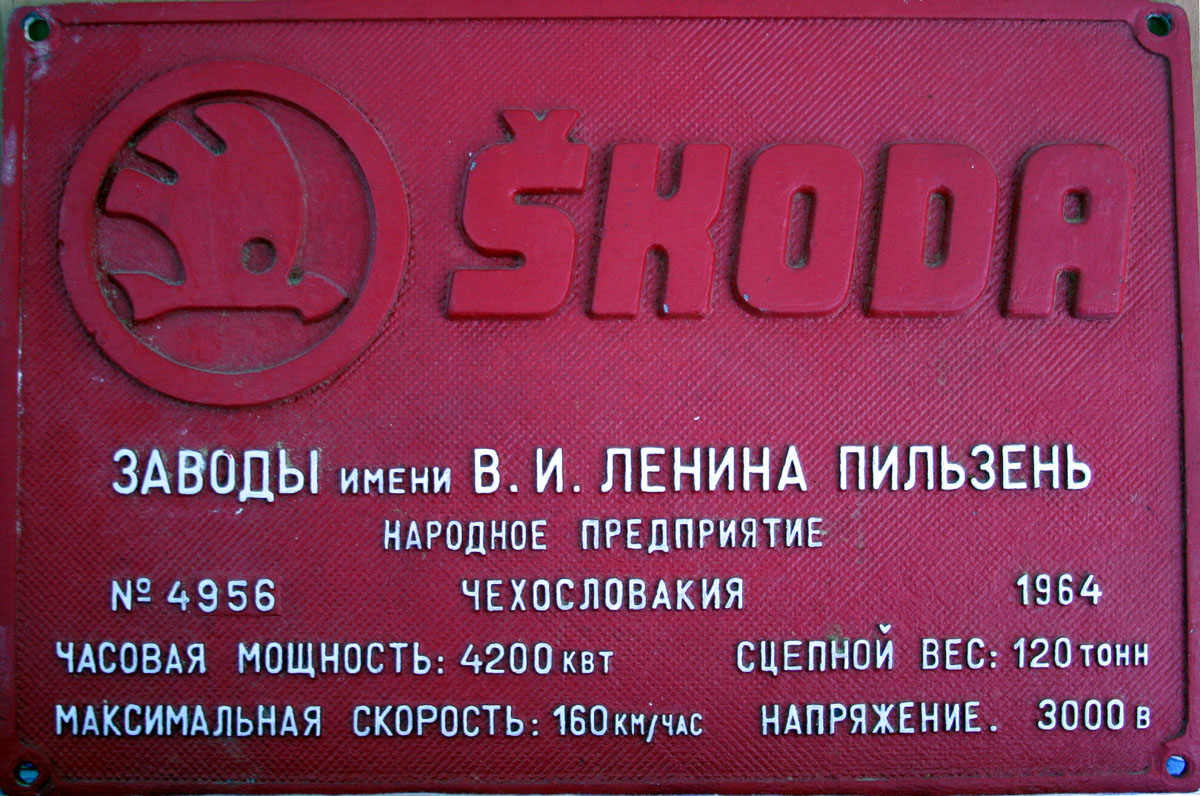
Škoda, Lenin Works Pilsen (People's Enterprise) in Russian Cyrillic

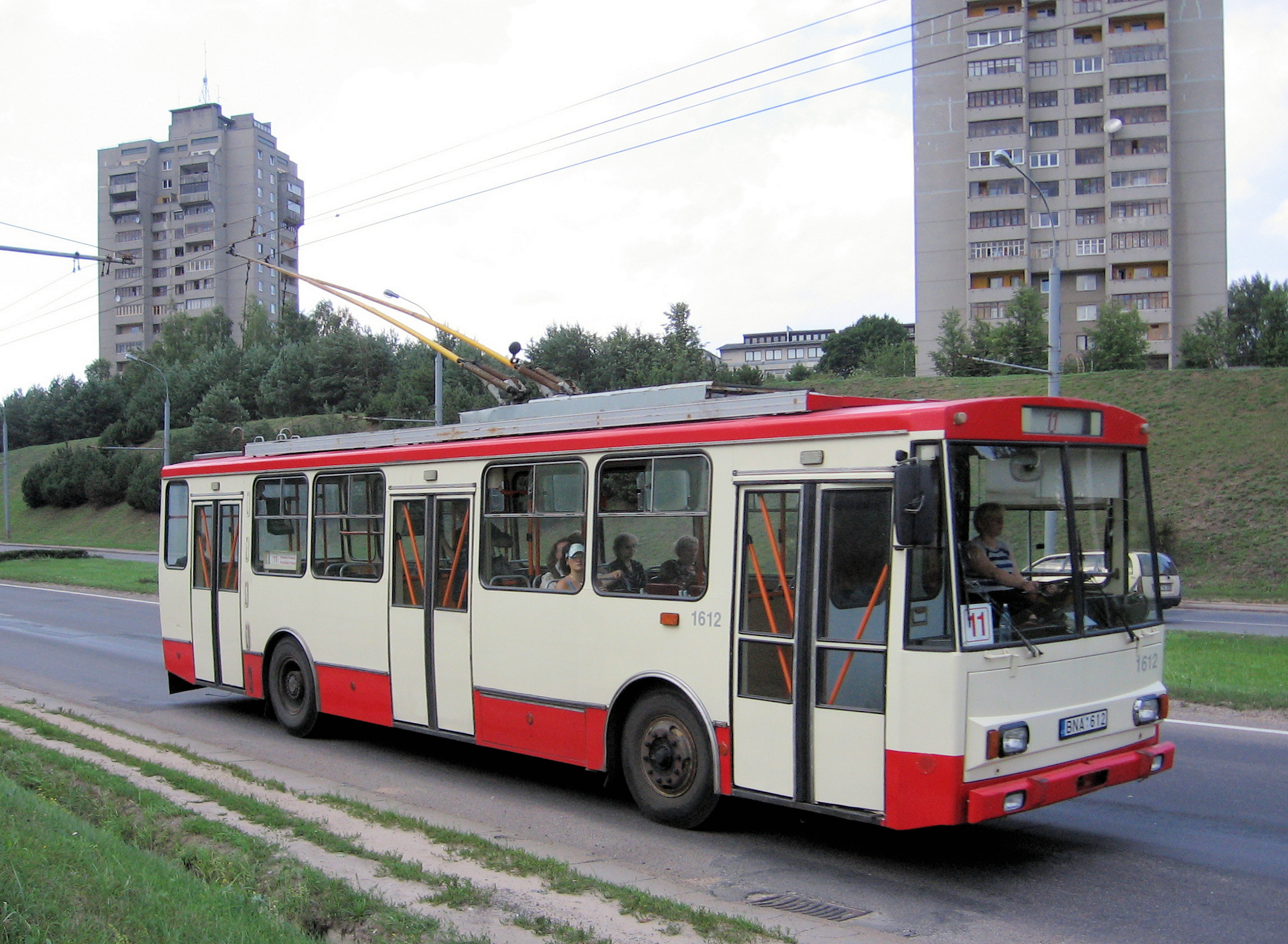
Škoda 14Tr trolleybus in Vilnius

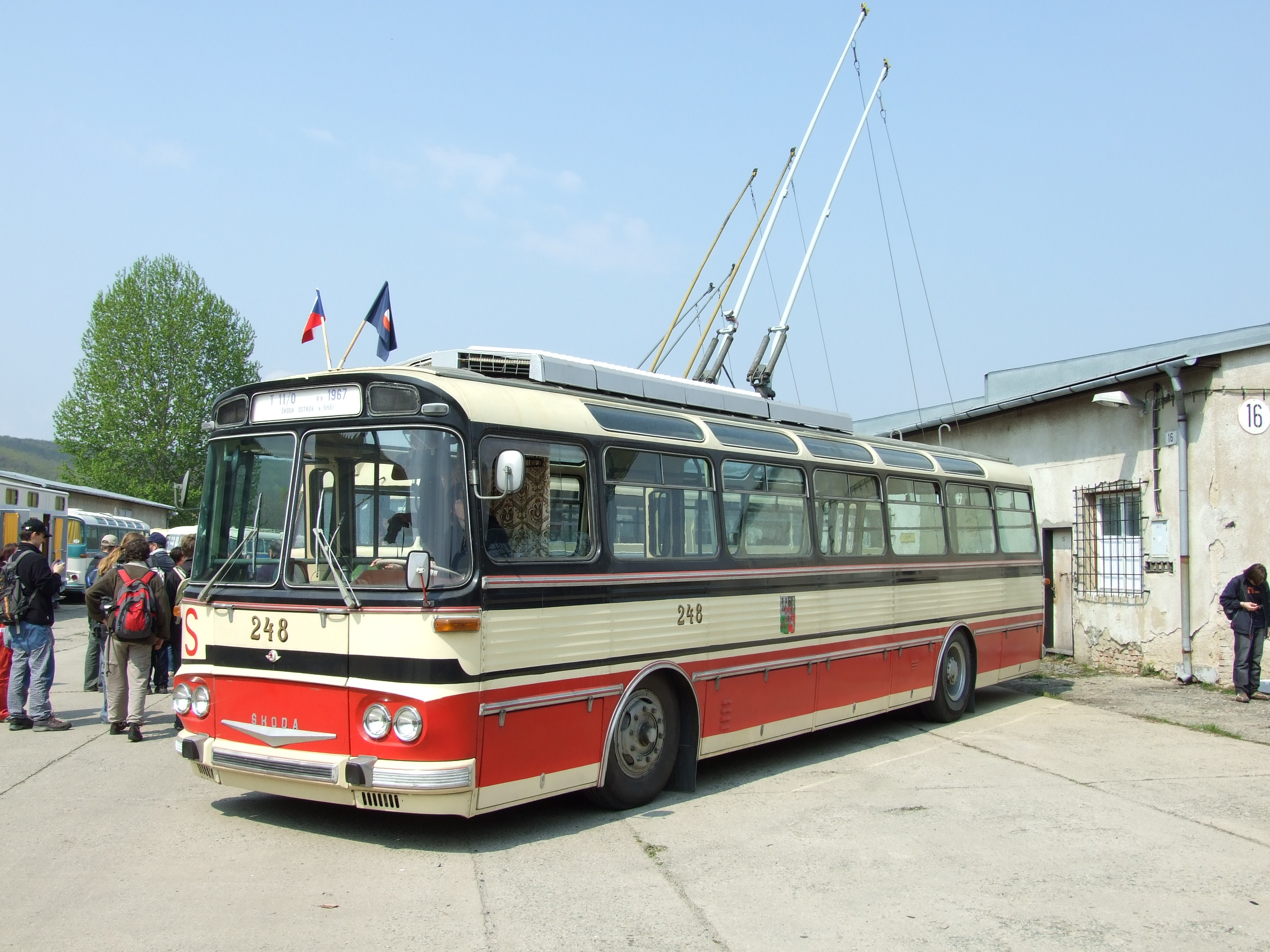
A Škoda T 11 Trolleybus in Brno bus depot

=== 1945–1989: Nationalisation and state ownership ===
The Czechoslovak state nationalised Škoda in October 1945, and a national enterprise was established the following year. The Mladá Boleslav car works became AZNP (Automobilové závody, národní podnik), later Škoda Auto. Further reorganisations of state-owned industry created independent national enterprises from the Hradec Králové works, which made equipment for the food and chemical industries, and the Brno electrical works. The armaments works in Dubnica and the Komárno shipyard also became independent.

Truck production was transferred to Avia, then began moving to factories in northern Bohemia in 1951 as Avia resumed aircraft manufacture. These factories formed the national enterprise LIAZ in January 1953.

The Plzeň enterprise was renamed Závody Vladimíra Iljiče Lenina (Vladimir Ilyich Lenin Works) on 21 December 1951. A cogwheel with a five-pointed star replaced the winged-arrow trademark. The company brought back the winged arrow after overseas customers failed to recognise the new trademark. The name was changed back to Škoda in 1965.

Škoda workers joined protests against the currency reform on 1 June 1953. They marched into central Plzeň, where the protests turned into demonstrations against communist rule. After security forces put down the uprising, some workers were sent to prison. Others lost their jobs or were evicted from their homes.

Locomotives, heavy machinery and trolleybuses made up much of Škoda’s production. Majority of its production went to the Soviet Union and other Eastern Bloc countries. It built the first E 499.0 electric locomotive in 1953 and went on to supply electric locomotives to railways in Czechoslovakia and abroad.

Škoda moved trolleybus production to Ostrov in 1960 and began building the 9Tr there in 1961. The Soviet Union bought most of these vehicles. Other orders included 20 for Bergen in Norway, delivered in 1972. Series production of the next model, the 14Tr, began in 1982.

Škoda also built equipment for electricity generation. Production of 110 MW steam turbines began in 1959. Škoda built its first 200 MW turboset in 1966 and began making 500 MW steam turbines in 1978. Its work in nuclear engineering dated back to 1956, when it set up a group dedicated to the field. In 1964, Škoda began manufacturing equipment for the A1 nuclear power station at Jaslovské Bohunice. Production of components for VVER reactors began in 1974, and a new reactor manufacturing hall opened in 1979. The company supplied Czechoslovak nuclear power stations and all four reactor units at Paks in Hungary.

During the Prague Spring in 1968, employees elected a workers' council to take part in managing the enterprise. Škoda became a centre of the workers’ council movement and hosted a national meeting in January 1969. The workers’ councils lost support within the Communist Party as the reforms were reversed following the Warsaw Pact invasion of August 1968.

In November 1989, Škoda workers joined the Velvet Revolution. They set up a strike committee on 21 November and took part in the general strike on 27 November, joining demonstrators in central Plzeň.

=== 1989–2011: Privatisation and restructuring ===
After communist rule ended in 1989, Škoda lost much of its market in Eastern Europe. Talks with Siemens about joint ventures ended without an agreement. During privatisation in the early 1990s, shares passed to Lubomír Soudek’s company NERo, major Czech banks and investors taking part in voucher privatisation. Under Soudek, Škoda borrowed to expand, acquiring the truck manufacturers LIAZ and Tatra and buying the German press manufacturer Umformtechnik. Several acquired businesses made losses, adding to the group’s debts. Škoda Auto, which had been separate from the Plzeň works since nationalisation, joined the Volkswagen Group in 1991 and became its wholly owned subsidiary in 2000.

Škoda also expanded into beverage-can production, opening a factory at Dýšina in 1996 before selling it in 1998. Škoda Energetika, which supplied the works with utilities, was sold in September 1998 to the Cinergy group. Škoda said the transaction would reduce its debt by more than CZK 1 billion. In February 1999, the supervisory board removed Soudek as chairman, and he also left his position as general director. Shareholders then approved a reduction in share capital to cover accumulated losses of more than CZK 8 billion since 1990.

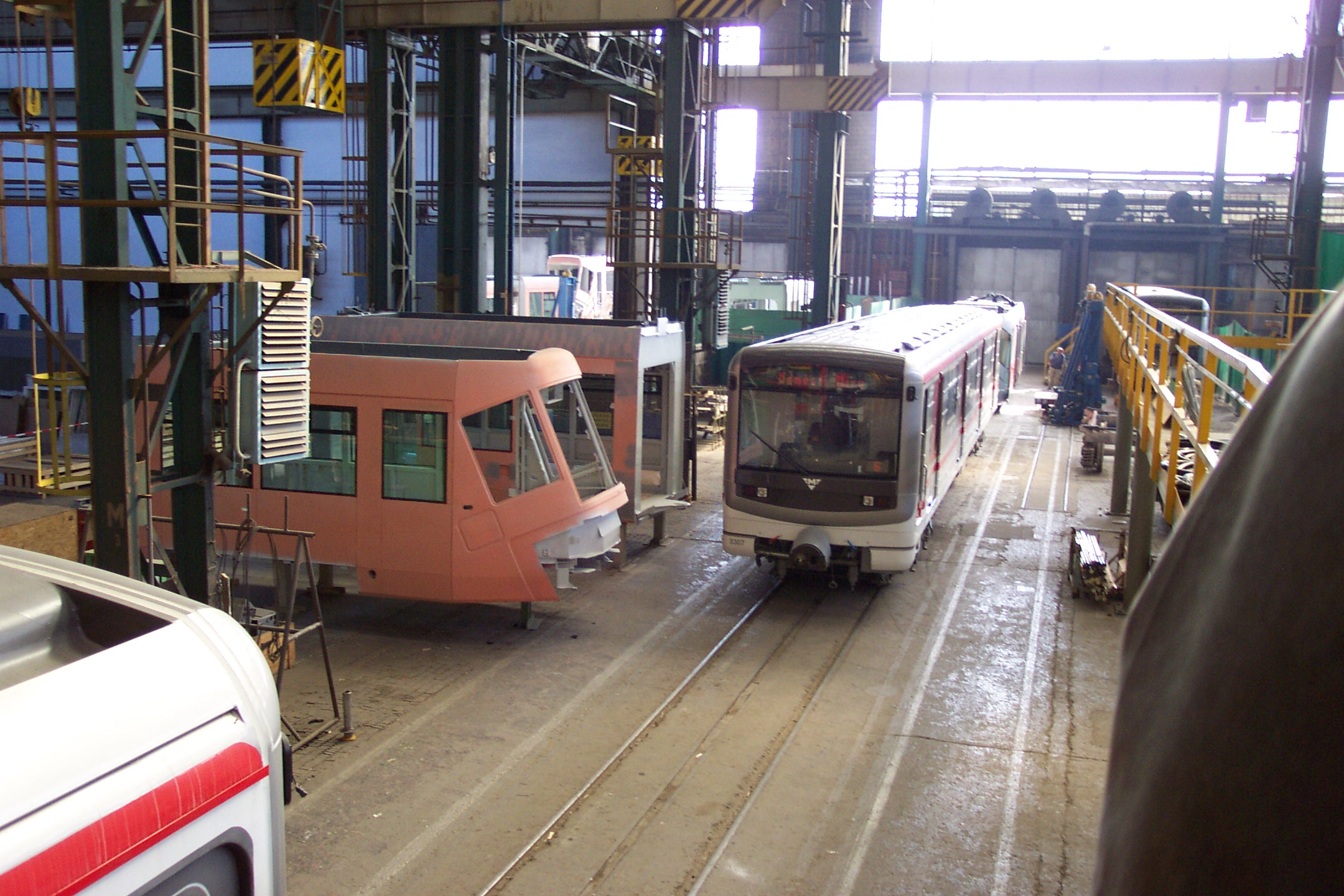
Hall of transportation section, parts of tram Škoda 14 T on left, modernized metro wagon 81-71 on right

The following year, Škoda a.s., Investiční a poštovní banka and the state-owned Revitalisation Agency established Škoda Holding, which acquired 19 operating companies from the parent. Some were profitable by the end of that year, including Škoda Energo and Škoda Machine Tool. The transfer protected much of the group’s production from the indebted parent’s possible bankruptcy, while restructuring continued. Konsolidační banka acquired 48.4% of the holding by converting CZK 2.1 billion of debt into shares. The state-owned bank was Škoda’s largest creditor. Divestments continued, as in March 2001, Škoda Energo sold its generator-manufacturing business to Britain’s FKI, together with its 840 employees.

The factories kept operating under Škoda Holding, but large debts remained with the parent company. Creditors petitioned for the company’s bankruptcy, which was declared in September 2001. Its majority stake in Škoda Holding became part of the bankruptcy estate, while subsidiaries continued operating during the proceedings.

In February 2003, Appian Group completed the purchase of a state-owned package of shares and creditor claims held by the Czech Consolidation Agency for CZK 350 million. It acquired the remaining shares in Škoda Holding from the original company’s bankruptcy estate the following month for CZK 450 million. The holding had reported a modest profit for 2002, although restructuring continued.

Under Appian, Škoda concentrated on transport engineering and power-generation equipment. The nuclear-equipment manufacturer Škoda JS and the metallurgy businesses Škoda Hutě and Škoda Kovárny were sold in 2004. Also in that year, the Slovak group Železiarne Podbrezová acquired the heavy-engineering company Škoda TS. Other disposals included the transformer and gearbox businesses, followed by Škoda Machine Tool in 2005 and Škoda Výzkum in 2006. The research institute became part of ÚJV Řež and continued collaboration with companies in the Škoda group. The gearbox manufacturer became Wikov Gear, and the metallurgy businesses were renamed Pilsen Steel in 2007.

Škoda also developed new types of vehicles during these years. It completed the prototype Astra low-floor tram in 1997 and began series production the following year. Portland, Oregon, received five double-ended trams based on the design in 2001. For the Prague Metro, Škoda worked with ČKD on rebuilding Soviet-made trains. The prototype 81-71M was completed in 1996 and entered passenger service on trial in 1998. By the time the work ended in 2011, 93 trains had been modernised.

Škoda stopped building trolleybuses at its Ostrov factory in 2004. It continued building trolleybuses in Plzeň, using bodies supplied by bus manufacturers. The 24Tr trolleybus, developed with Karosa, was unveiled in September 2003. Škoda began working with two other bus manufacturers, Solaris in 2008 and SOR in 2010.

The transport business grew through acquisitions. Škoda bought a controlling stake in the railway design and testing company VÚKV in 2004, followed by ČKD Vagonka in 2005. It acquired the railway repair companies Pars nova and MOVO in 2008. Overseas investments included a half share in the Russian motor manufacturer Sibelektroprivod in 2004. In 2006, Škoda and the Hungarian investor Resonator established Ganz–Škoda, which acquired assets and technology from the insolvent transport-equipment manufacturer Ganz Transelektro Közlekedési. Export orders included trams for Wrocław and double-deck electric trains for Lithuania, where the first units entered passenger service in 2008.

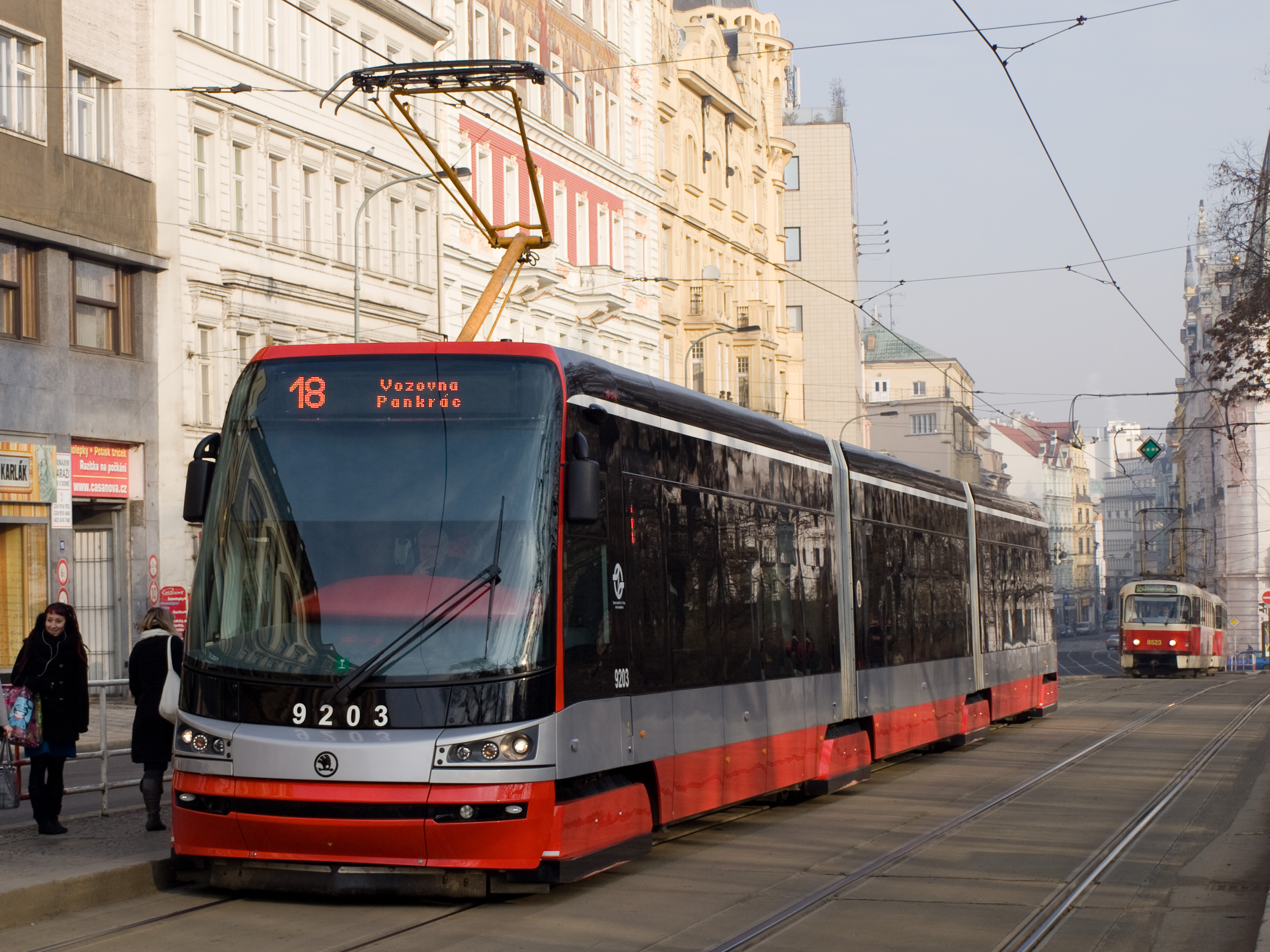
Low floor tram Škoda 15 T in Prague

Parts of the Plzeň works were opened to other businesses. Redevelopment began in 2004, with unused buildings demolished and roads and utilities improved to prepare about 50 hectares for investment. Škoda Transportation also invested more than CZK 2 billion in new production halls, which were in use by 2009. In November 2008, Techmania opened to the public in a former factory building. Škoda and the University of West Bohemia had established the science-centre project three years earlier.

The €450 million sale of Škoda Power to Doosan was completed in December 2009. The sale left transport engineering as the group’s main industrial activity. Škoda Holding changed its name to Škoda Investment in 2010 as part of a reorganisation of the transport businesses.

In September 2010, Škoda managers Tomáš Krsek and Michal Korecký and Appian managers Marek Čmejla and Jiří Diviš announced that they were buying Škoda Transportation from Appian. The price was not disclosed. By then, the former group’s remaining manufacturing businesses were concentrated in Škoda Transportation and its subsidiaries.

== Former subsidiaries ==
=== Businesses separated during restructuring ===
Former Škoda business	Activities	Development
Škoda Transportation	Rail vehicles, trolleybuses and electrical equipment	Škoda's transport businesses were brought together under Škoda Transportation. They now form part of Škoda Group.
Škoda Power	Steam turbines, heat exchangers and condensers	Doosan bought the company in 2009. It continues as Doosan Škoda Power.
Škoda JS	Nuclear engineering, equipment and services	Škoda Holding sold the company in 2004. ČEZ acquired it in November 2022.
Škoda Hutě and Škoda Kovárny	Steel castings and heavy forgings	The two businesses were sold in 2004 and merged to form Pilsen Steel in 2007. After production stopped and the company went bankrupt, Max Aicher bought the plant in 2020.
Precision-forging operation	Open-die and closed-die forgings in steel and non-ferrous alloys	Separated from Škoda Steel in 2003 to become Czech Precision Forge.
Škoda Machine Tool	Heavy machine tools	Stanko Impex Group bought the company in 2005. It continues making machine tools under the name ŠMT.
Škoda TS	Tyre-curing and hydraulic presses, rolling-mill equipment and equipment for sugar processing	Sold to the Železiarne Podbrezová group in 2004 and later renamed TS Plzeň. Manufacturing in Plzeň was wound down in 2019, and its activities passed to ŽĎAS Manufacturing in Plzeň was wound down in 2019, and its activities passed to ŽĎAS.
Škoda Ozubená kola / Škoda Gear	Gears and industrial gearboxes	Joined Wikov in 2004 and was subsequently renamed Wikov Gear. It became Wikov TurboGear on 1 January 2025.
Generator division of Škoda Energo	Electrical generators	Sold to FKI in 2001 and later operated as BRUSH SEM. The business joined Baker Hughes in 2022 and began using the BRUSH Power Generation name in 2024.
Transformer division of Škoda Energo	Power transformers	BEZ Bohemia bought the division in 2004. Transformer production continues at ETD Transformátory.
Controls division of Škoda Energo	Control systems and power electronics	ZAT acquired the control-systems business serving the power industry. The transport power-electronics and drives business became part of Škoda Electric.
Škoda Výzkum	Industrial research, testing and engineering	ÚJV Řež bought the institute in 2006. It was renamed VZÚ Plzeň in 2011. Some commercial activities moved to iCVŘ in February 2026, and the institute merged into Centrum výzkumu Řež that April.
Škoda Nářadí / Pilsen Tools	Tools and precision metal components	The toolmaking business later operated as Pilsen Tools, which entered insolvency proceedings in 2019. IBZ Group took over its machinery, production hall and employees in 2021.
Škoda Klatovy	Industrial furnaces	The company went bankrupt in 2002, and the factory closed in 2005. E-therm TZ acquired its technical archive and supplies spare parts and services for furnaces built by Škoda Klatovy.
Škoda Energetika	Electricity, heat and other utilities	Later known as Plzeňská energetika. It merged into Plzeňská teplárenská in 2018.
Tobacco-machinery operation	Machinery for tobacco processing and cigarette production	Molins bought the business in November 2000. In 2017, Molins sold its instrumentation and tobacco-machinery division to G.D, part of Coos.
Dýšina beverage-can factory	Aluminium beverage cans	Opened in 1996 and sold to Schmalbach-Lubeca in 1998. It later passed to Rexam and then Ball Corporation.

Škoda stopped making trolleybuses at its Ostrov factory in 2004. Production continued in Plzeň.

=== Earlier separations ===
Former Škoda factory	Activities	Subsequent development
Car factory in Mladá Boleslav	Passenger cars	Became Automobilové závody, národní podnik (AZNP), after nationalisation. The business developed into Škoda Auto, which joined the Volkswagen Group in 1991 and became its wholly owned subsidiary in 2000.
Engineering works in Hradec Králové	Equipment for the food and chemical industries	Became independent in 1950 and adopted the name Závody Vítězného února (ZVÚ) in 1953. Later reorganisations created several businesses using the ZVU name.
Adamov works	Machinery, including printing equipment	Became independent in 1950 and was renamed Adamovské strojírny in 1952. The printing-machinery business, later known as ADAST, entered liquidation in 2009. The fuel-dispensing equipment business continues separately as Adast Systems.
Brno electrical works	Electrical equipment	Separated from Škoda during the post-war reorganisation and became Elektrotechnické závody Julia Fučíka (EJF). ABB bought the business in 1993.
Dubnica armaments works	Armaments and ammunition	Became independent after nationalisation. Later reorganisations created separate businesses, including the ammunition manufacturer ZVS and the military-equipment manufacturer ZTS Špeciál.
Komárno shipyard	Shipbuilding	Became the independent enterprise Slovenské lodenice on 1 January 1950.
České Budějovice foundry	Castings	Became independent in March 1990. It later operated as SCB Foundry and closed in 2017.

=== Acquisitions and joint ventures ===
Škoda also bought interests in existing manufacturers and established joint ventures abroad.

Company or venture	Relationship with Škoda and subsequent development
LIAZ	Škoda acquired control in 1995. The business later operated within Truck International, which went bankrupt in 2001. Its Mnichovo Hradiště factory was sold that year, but truck production there ended in 2003.
Tatra	Škoda acquired a substantial shareholding during its expansion in the 1990s. Konsolidační banka bought Škoda's 43 per cent stake in August 1999.
Umformtechnik Erfurt	Škoda bought the German press manufacturer in 1994 and sold it to Müller Weingarten in 2001.
Electric Transit, Inc.	Trolleybus joint venture owned 65 per cent by Škoda and 35 per cent by AAI Corporation. It completed deliveries and a retrofit programme under its final production contract in 2004.
Sibelektroprivod	Russian manufacturer of electric motors and generators. Škoda acquired a half share in 2004.
Ganz–Škoda	Joint venture established with the Hungarian investor Resonator in 2006. It bought assets, manufacturing technology and intellectual-property rights from the insolvent transport-equipment manufacturer Ganz Transelektro Közlekedési.

== See also ==
- Category:Škoda locomotives
- Category:Škoda trams
- Electric Transit, Inc.
- List of the largest artificial non-nuclear explosions

== Books ==
- Alirezaijan, Reza (2025). 'Škodovy závody Teherán:Českoslovenští architekti v říši perského šáha, 1932–1948'. Books & Pipes Brno. ISBN 978-80-7485-302-9.
