= 24 cm Haubitze 39 =

24 cm houfnice vz.39 (24 cm Haubitze 39)
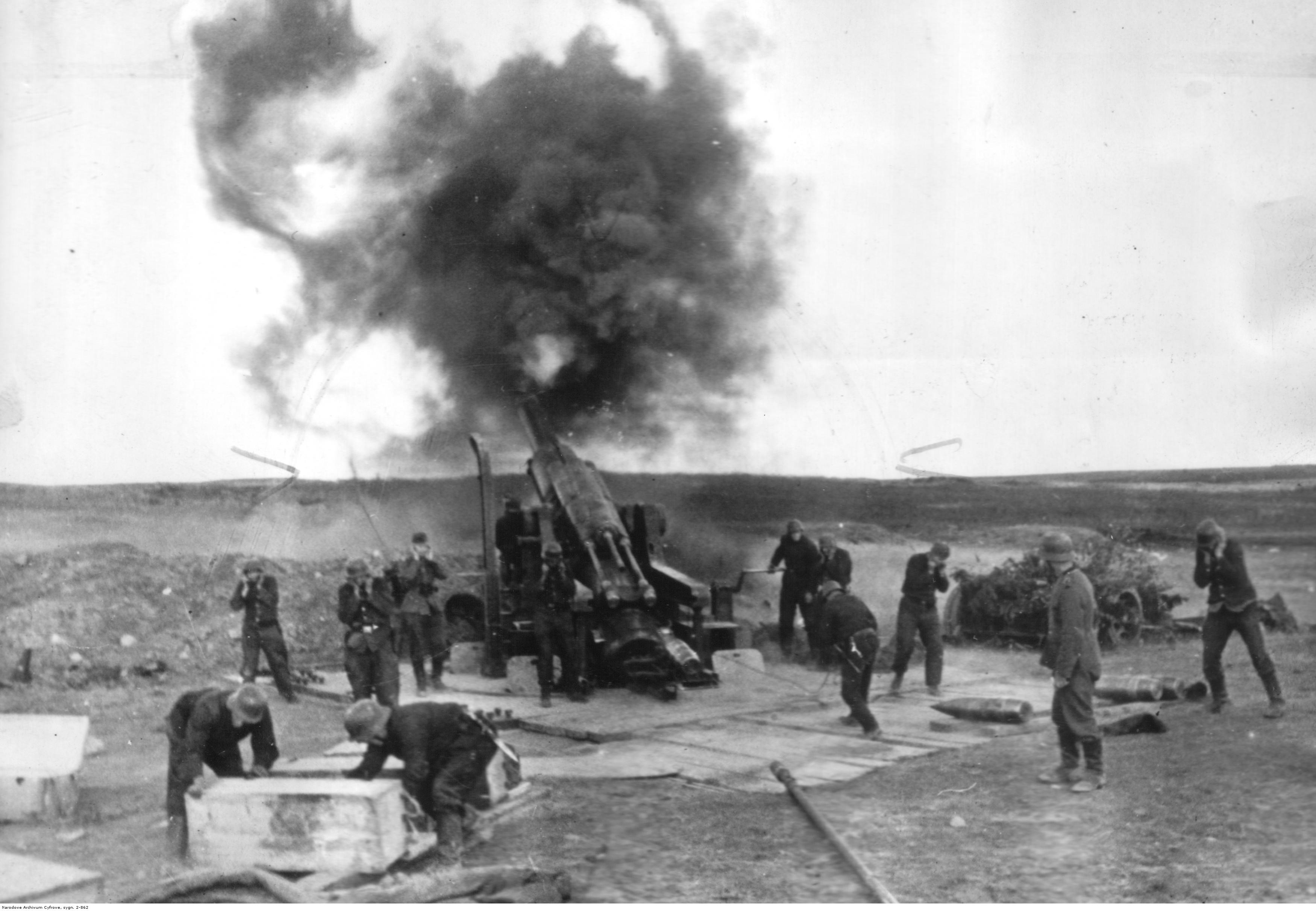
- A 24 cm Haubitze 39 in 1941 during the Siege of Leningrad.
- Type: Heavy Siege Howitzer
- Place of origin: Czechoslovakia

Service history
- In service: 1939–1945
- Used by: Turkey; Nazi Germany
- Wars: World War II

Production history
- Designer: Škoda
- Manufacturer: Škoda
- Produced: 1939–42
- No. built: 18
- Variants: H 39/40

Specifications
- Mass: 27,000 kg (60,000 lb)
- Length: 6.765 m (22 ft 2 in) (total length of gun)
- Shell: separate-loading, bagged charge
- Shell weight: 166 kilograms (366 lb)
- Caliber: 240 millimetres (9.4 in)
- Breech: Interrupted screw, de Bange obturation
- Carriage: Box trail
- Elevation: -4° to +70°
- Traverse: 360°
- Rate of fire: 1 rd per 2 minutes
- Muzzle velocity: 600 m/s (2,000 ft/s)
- Maximum firing range: 18 kilometres (11 mi)
- Filling: TNT
- Filling weight: 23.66 kg (52 lb 3 oz)

The 24 cm houfnice vz.39 (German designation: 24 cm Haubitze 39) (Howitzer model 39) was a Czechoslovak-designed siege howitzer used in the Second World War. It was kept in production after the German occupation of Czechoslovakia in March 1939 and sixteen were delivered to the Germans. It was only used by the Army's Artillery Regiment 814 and entered service shortly before the Battle of France in 1940. The regiment participated in Operation Barbarossa and in the Sieges of Sevastopol and Leningrad.

== Description and development ==
Škoda designed it for export and Turkey ordered a batch, but only received two before the Germans occupied Czechoslovakia in March 1939. It was a stablemate of the Škoda 21 cm Kanone 39 and used virtually the same mounting and transport arrangements. It used an interrupted screw breech with a de Bange obturator to provide the gas seal with bagged propellant. The carriage revolved on a ball-race firing platform that had to be dug-in before firing, a task that took six to eight hours to accomplish. It broke down into three loads for transport, the barrel, carriage and the ground platform. A modified version entered service in 1942 as the H 39/40 although the changes merely simplified production. A total of sixteen were delivered to Germany.

=== Ammunition ===
It used both Czechoslovak and German-designed ammunition. The Czechoslovak-designed 24 cm Gr 39(t) HE shell had a weight of 166 kilograms (366 lb). It used both nose and base fuses, two copper driving bands and contained a 23.66 kilograms (52.2 lb) bursting charge of TNT. The German copy, the 24 cm Gr 39 umg had only a German nose fuze, soft-iron driving bands and a smaller charge of 22.9 kilograms (50 lb). It also used a Czechoslovak-designed anti-concrete shell, the 24 cm Gr 39 Be, that had copper driving bands. It used 5 bagged charges that were enclosed in a single larger bag. Increments were simply removed to adjust range as necessary.

== Combat history ==
The 1st Battalion of Artillery Regiment 814 was formed on 15 March 1940 with four batteries of H39s. A month later, the Third and Fourth Batteries were used to form the 2nd battalion of the regiment. The 2nd Battalion was still forming when the Battle of France began on 10 May 1940, but the 1st Battalion was assigned to Army Group B's reserve – it is uncertain if it saw any combat during the campaign. The regiment was assigned to 1st Panzer Group in Army Group South for Operation Barbarossa. It was transferred to 11th Army for the Siege of Sevastopol in late 1941—42. It accompanied that army as part of its siege train when it was transferred north to attack Leningrad in the late summer of 1942. It remained under the command of Army Group North until it re-equipped with smaller guns in July 1944. Nothing is known of any units that might have been equipped with the howitzers after July 1944. Artillery Regiment 814 is the only unit known to have been equipped with the H39 howitzer.
