= Škoda 10 cm vz. 38 howitzer =

Škoda 10 cm vz. 38
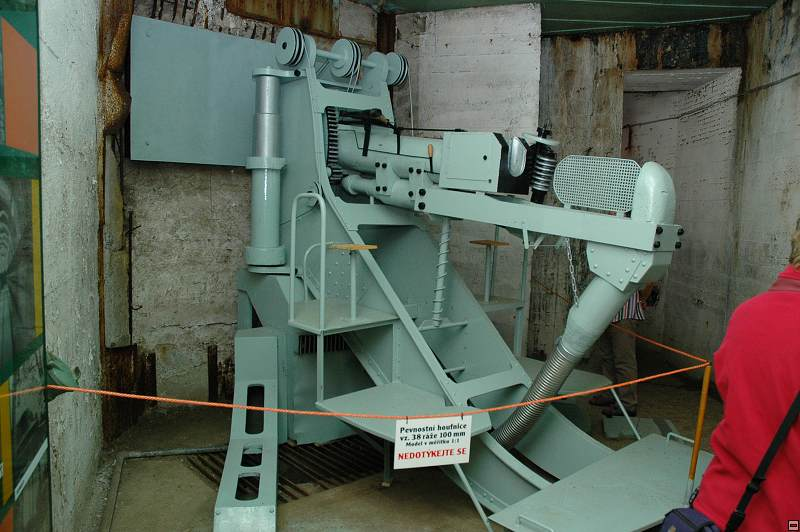
- Mock up of a Škoda 10 cm vz. 38 howitzer N-D-S 75 at fortress Dobrošov near Náchod
- Place of origin: Czechoslovakia

Service history
- Wars: World War II

Production history
- Designer: Škoda
- Designed: 1935
- Manufacturer: Škoda
- Produced: 1938
- No. built: 15

Specifications
- Length: 3.25 m (10 ft 8 in)
- Barrel length: 2.5 m (8 ft 2 in)
- Crew: 2
- Shell: Fixed QF ammunition
- Shell weight: 16 kg (35 lb)
- Caliber: 100 mm (3.9 in)
- Breech: Semi-automatic vertical sliding breech block
- Carriage: Single mount casemates
- Elevation: -10° to +38°
- Traverse: Early mounts: -22.3° to +22.3° Later mounts: -30° to +30°
- Rate of fire: 7 rpm
- Muzzle velocity: 525 m/s (1,720 ft/s)
- Maximum firing range: 12 km (7.5 mi)

The Škoda 10 cm vz. 38 was a light howitzer deployed in single gun defensive casemates in the Czechoslovak border fortifications before World War II.

== History ==
The Škoda 10 cm vz. 38 was developed and built by Škoda Works in Plzeň. Development of the howitzer began in March 1935 after an order was placed by the Czechoslovak Department of National Defense. The design was based on an existing field howitzer the 10 cm vz. 30. The howitzer was put into production during 1938 and fifteen were completed but never deployed to the Czechoslovak border fortifications. After occupation Czechoslovakia by Germany in 1939, the howitzers were seized and allegedly used by the German Army. After World War II all fifteen howitzers were scrapped. Today two wood and metal mock ups of the howitzers are housed in the museum of artillery at Dobrošov fort near Náchod. The mock ups were acquired in 1973 from the museum of artillery at Hanička fort and used as props in the filming of Days of Betrayal by director Otakar Vávra.
