= Vladimir Palikhata =

Russian entrepreneur and philanthropist (born 1967)

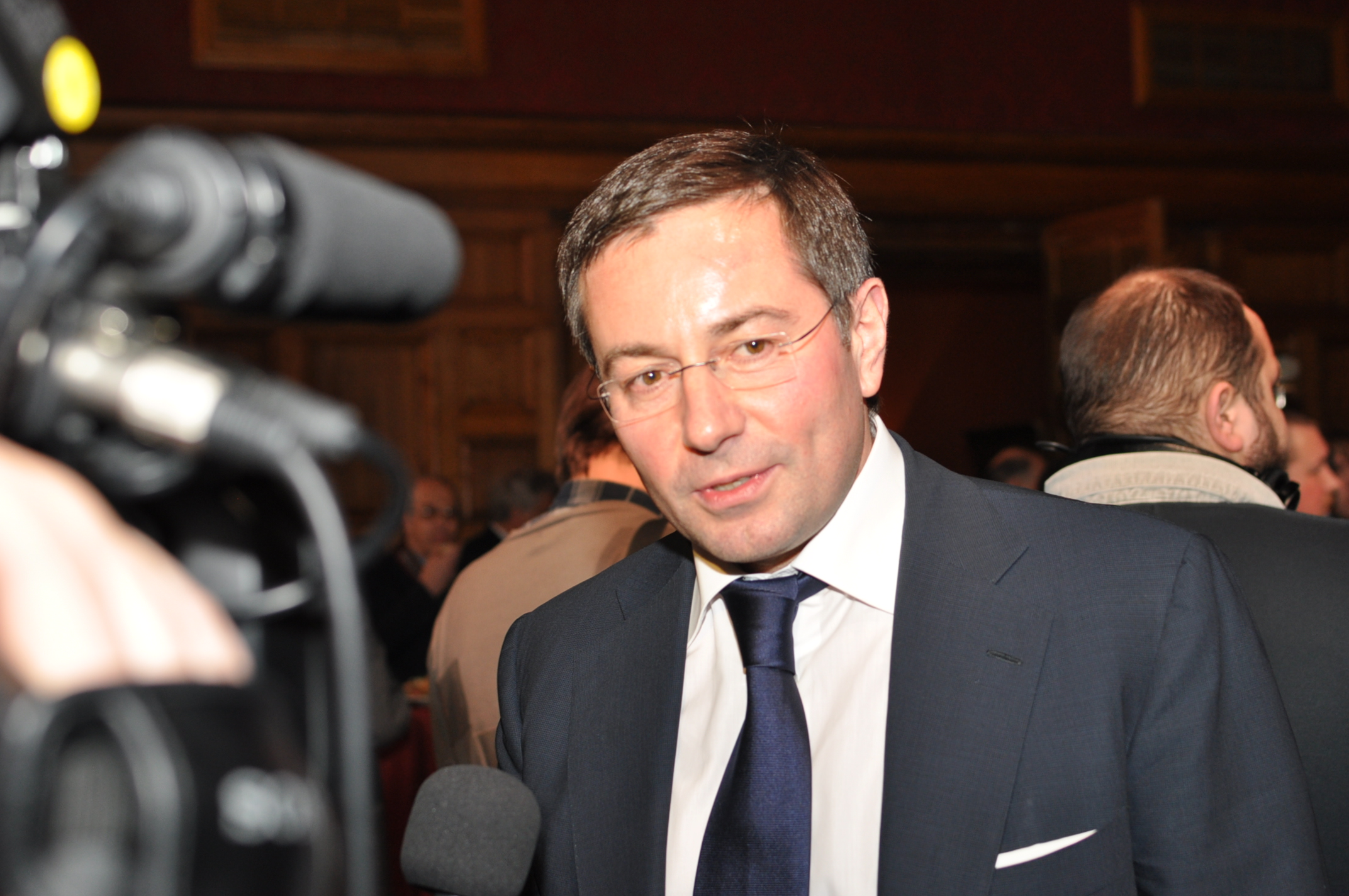
- Born: Vladimir Mironovich Palikhata; September 23, 1967 (age 58); Zolotniki Village, Ternopil Oblast, Ukraine
- Occupation: Businessman
- Children: 3

Vladimir Mironovich Palikhata (Russian: Владимир Миронович Палихата; born 23 September 1967 in Zolotniki Village, Ternopil Oblast, Ukraine) is a Russian entrepreneur and philanthropist, President of Rosenergomash Group (electrical engineering), Legacy Capital investment firm and President of the Moscow Chess Federation.

== Biography ==
After school, Vladimir Palikhata served in the Soviet Army from 1985 to 1987. He received a diploma from Borschevsky Electrical Technical College in 1991, from which he graduated as an electrician/mechanic. He moved from Ukraine to Moscow the same year.

Between 1991 and 1993, Palikhata worked as a line manager and forwarding agent for a trading and purchasing cooperative. In 1993, he became an independent trader on the Russian Commodity and Resource Exchange (RSTB) and the Moscow Commodity Exchange (MTB), Russia's two largest commodity exchanges in the early- and mid-1990's.

Palikhata received a degree in Business Competitiveness Management from the Moscow State Academy of Business Administration.

== Entrepreneurial activities ==
Vladimir Palikhata consolidated electrical engineering assets (including manufacturing of low-voltage switches, electrical components, generators and engines) in Russia and Ukraine, uniting them into Rosenergomash Group, which he managed himself.

Vladimir Palikhata's complaint of attempted extortion led to arrest of a Russian Prosecutor General’s Office investigator Andrei Grivtsov. The investigator allegedly tried to extort a US$15 million bribe from Palikhata in exchange for dropping criminal charges for illegal corporate raiding (the Moscow City Court released Grivtsov in February on bail). The record amount of alleged extortion ensured that the incident had a very high profile in Russia.

== Philanthropy and public work ==
Russian Olympic Committee President Leonid Tyagachev and Vladimir Palikhata, in his capacity as President of Rosenergomash Group, signed an agreement in October 2007 making Rosenergomash a General Sponsor of the Russian Olympic Committee.

President of the Russian Rhythmic Gymnastics Federation Irina Viner and Rosenergomash Group President Vladimir Palikhata signed a partnership agreement in March 2009. Irina Viner proposed that all financial assistance should go directly to the young girl gymnasts who were just starting out in the Big Sport.

President of Kalmykia Republic Kirsan Ilyumzhinov and Rosenergomash Group President Vladimir Palikhata signed an agreement to provide charitable aid on 1 June 2009, the International Day for Protection of Children. The agreement provides for sending underprivileged children of Kalmykia to Orlenok children's resort camp, which stands on the shore of the Sea of Azov in Kherson Region (Ukraine) and is controlled by Rosenergomash.

Vladislav Tretyak and Rosenergomash President Vladimir Palikhata agreed on a long-term partnership program on 6 July 2009. Under this arrangement, Rosenergomash became a sponsor and founder of special prizes for 2009 Challenge Cup children's international hockey tournament which was held in Moscow from August 7 through 11, 2009.

At a March 2010 press conference called to announce nominees for the 2009 Nika Russian National Cinematographic Award, a newly signed agreement between Nika Award (signed by the Award's founder and untiring organizer Yuli Gusman) and Rosenergomash Group (signed by the Group's President Vladimir Palikhata) was announced. The agreement, which came into effect from July 2009, made Rosenergomash Group an official partner of the national cinematographic Nika Award, and the Group pledged to assist the award organizers in every possible way.

Vladimir Palikhata is a co-publisher of Our Heritage («Наше наследие» (“Nashe Nasledie”)) Magazine. He also became one of the founders of an eponymous Nashe Nasledie Charitable Foundation in 2012. The new foundation's first event in April 2012 was an Evening of Chess at the Central Literary Author's House, as part of a renewed tradition. Guests of honor at the event included Soviet president Mikhail Gorbachev, Advisor to the Russian president Arkady Dvorkovich, People's Artist of Russia actor and director Stanislav Govorukhin, movie director Yuli Gusman, former lawmaker and radio host Alexei Mitrofanov, politician and FIDE president Kirsan Ilyumzhinov and other notable persons. Evening of Chess events are expected to become regularly recurring.

Vladimir Palikhata was elected president of the Moscow Chess Federation (MCF) on 12 May 2012. In a savvy move to promote the federation, he arranged for competition chess sets to be sent to the mayors of Moscow's 86 twin cities – national capitals and regional cities around the world – as an International Chess Day gift. His cover letter to the Mayors “extolled the virtues and benefits of chess – "a wise and ancient game," which, according to the release, can "help reduce stress associated with managing a city" and "bring pleasure".

== Personal life ==
He is married and raising three children.
