= Škoda 7.5 cm d/29 Model 1911 =

Škoda 7.5 cm Model 1911
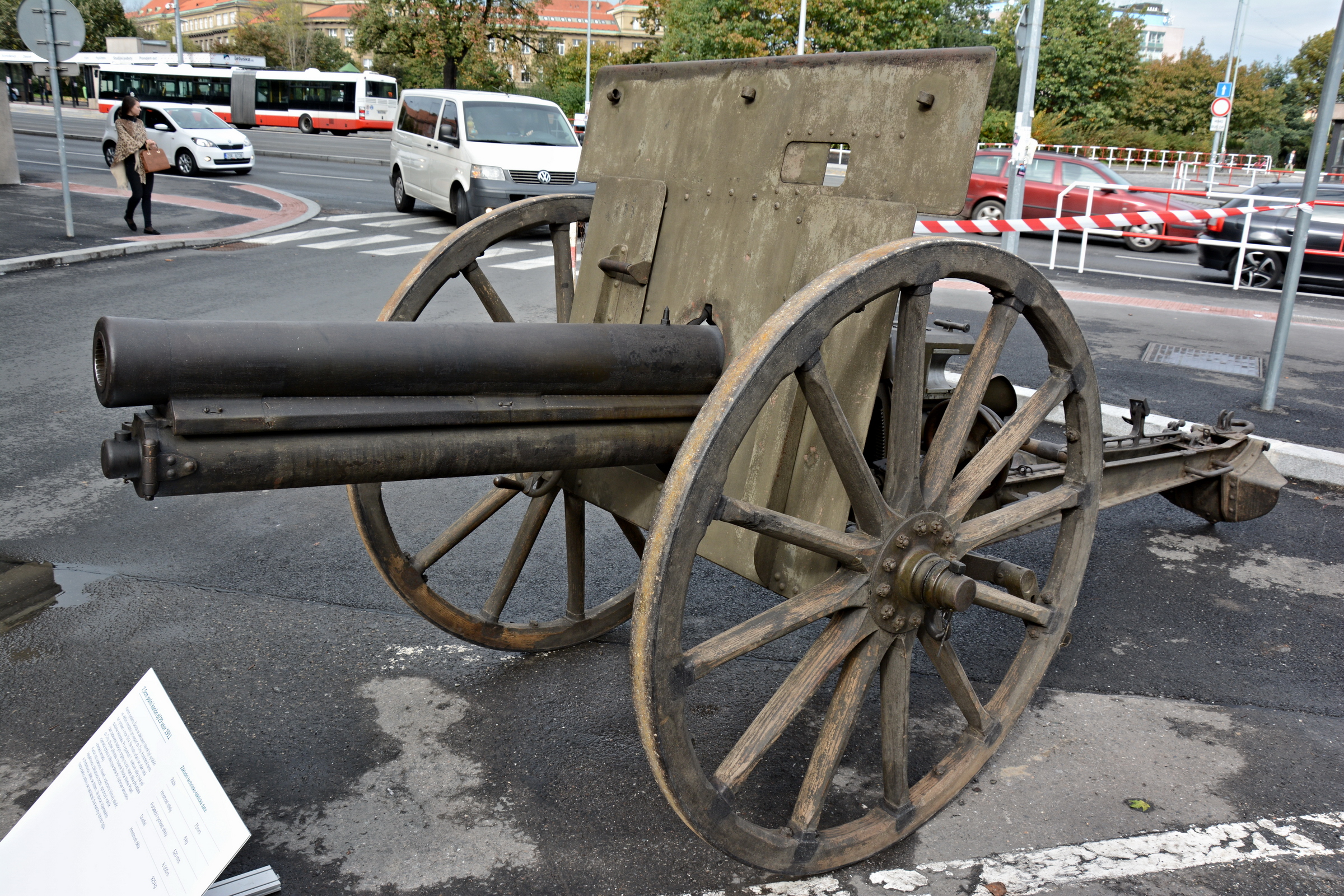
- A Škoda Model 1911 of the Military History Institute in Prague
- Place of origin: Austria-Hungary

Service history
- Used by: Republic of China; Austria-Hungary; Kingdom of Italy; Czechoslovakia
- Wars: World War I

Production history
- Designer: Škoda
- Designed: 1911
- Manufacturer: Škoda
- Produced: 1912

Specifications
- Mass: 925 kg (2,039 lb)
- Shell: Fixed QF ammunition
- Shell weight: 6 kg (13 lb)
- Caliber: 7.5 cm (3.0 in) 29 caliber
- Muzzle velocity: 520 m/s (1,700 ft/s)
- Maximum firing range: 6 km (3.7 mi)

The Škoda 7.5 cm d/29 Model 1911 also known as the 7.5 cm polní kanón d/29 vzor 1911 was a light howitzer produced by Škoda before the First World War. It was used during World War I by the Austro-Hungarian Army and some pieces were still in reserve with the Czechoslovak Army in 1938.

== History ==
The Škoda 7.5 cm Model 1911 was developed and built by Škoda Works in Plzeň. At the time the Austro-Hungarian Army was looking to modernize its artillery and a number of test models were built. The Austro-Hungarian Army did not order the guns, but they attracted the interest of the Chinese Army and after testing they placed an order with the first shipments beginning in 1912. A repeat order was placed in 1914 and after the outbreak of World War I a shipment of guns aboard a ship destined for China were confiscated by the Italians, who were at that time still neutral. It is believed that the guns seized by the Italians were used by the Italian Army during World War I. The twenty four remaining guns of the Chinese order were confiscated and incorporated into the Austro-Hungarian Army. After World War I the surviving guns were passed to the Czechoslovak Army and in 1938 six guns were estimated to still be held in reserve. An unknown number of guns were captured by the Romanian Army from the Austro-Hungarian forces during World War I. Seven of these are on display in Romania: 4 at the Mărășești Mausoleum, two guarding a WW1 monument in Godinești village, Gorj and one in the National Military Museum in Bucharest.

== Gallery ==
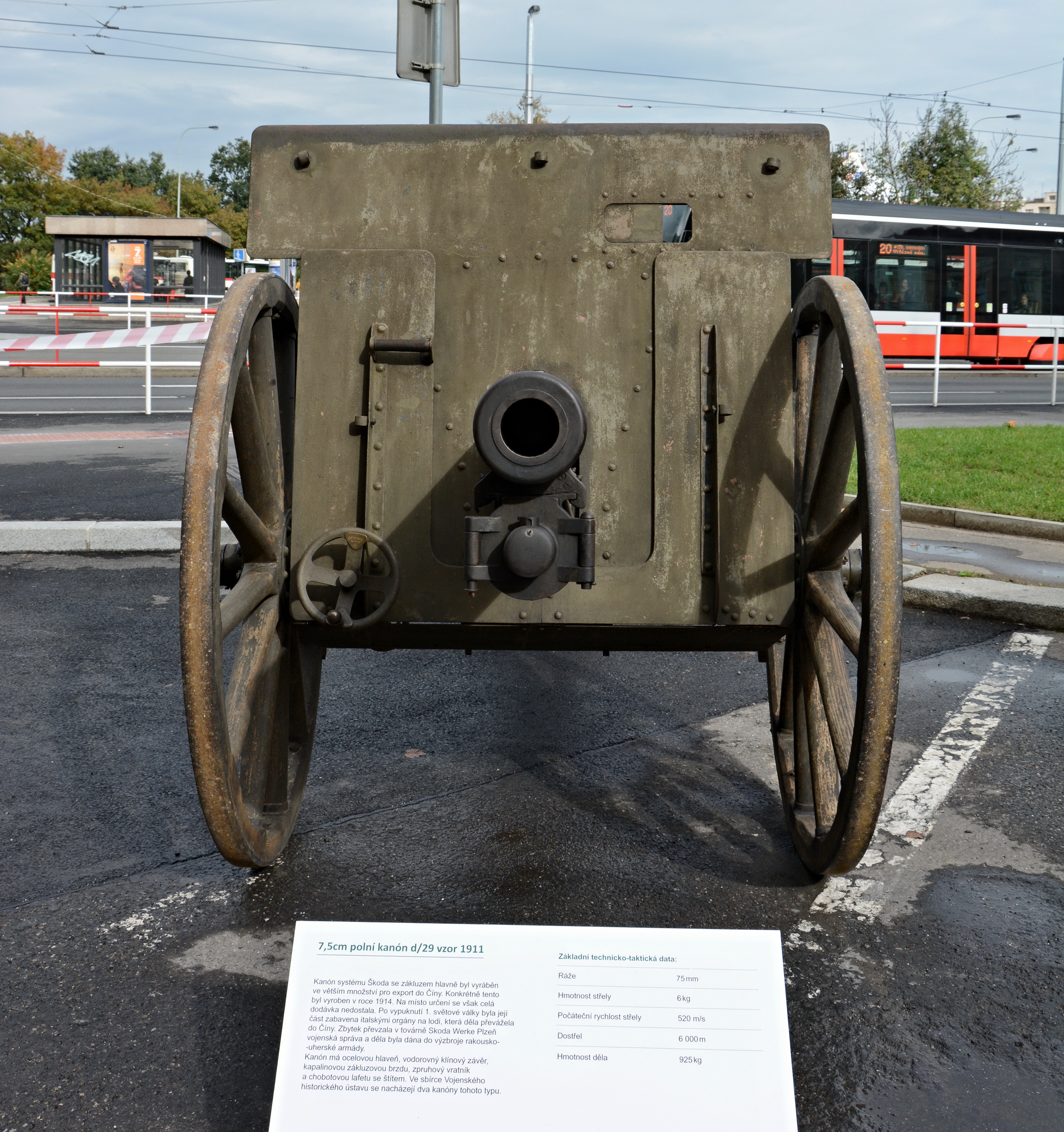

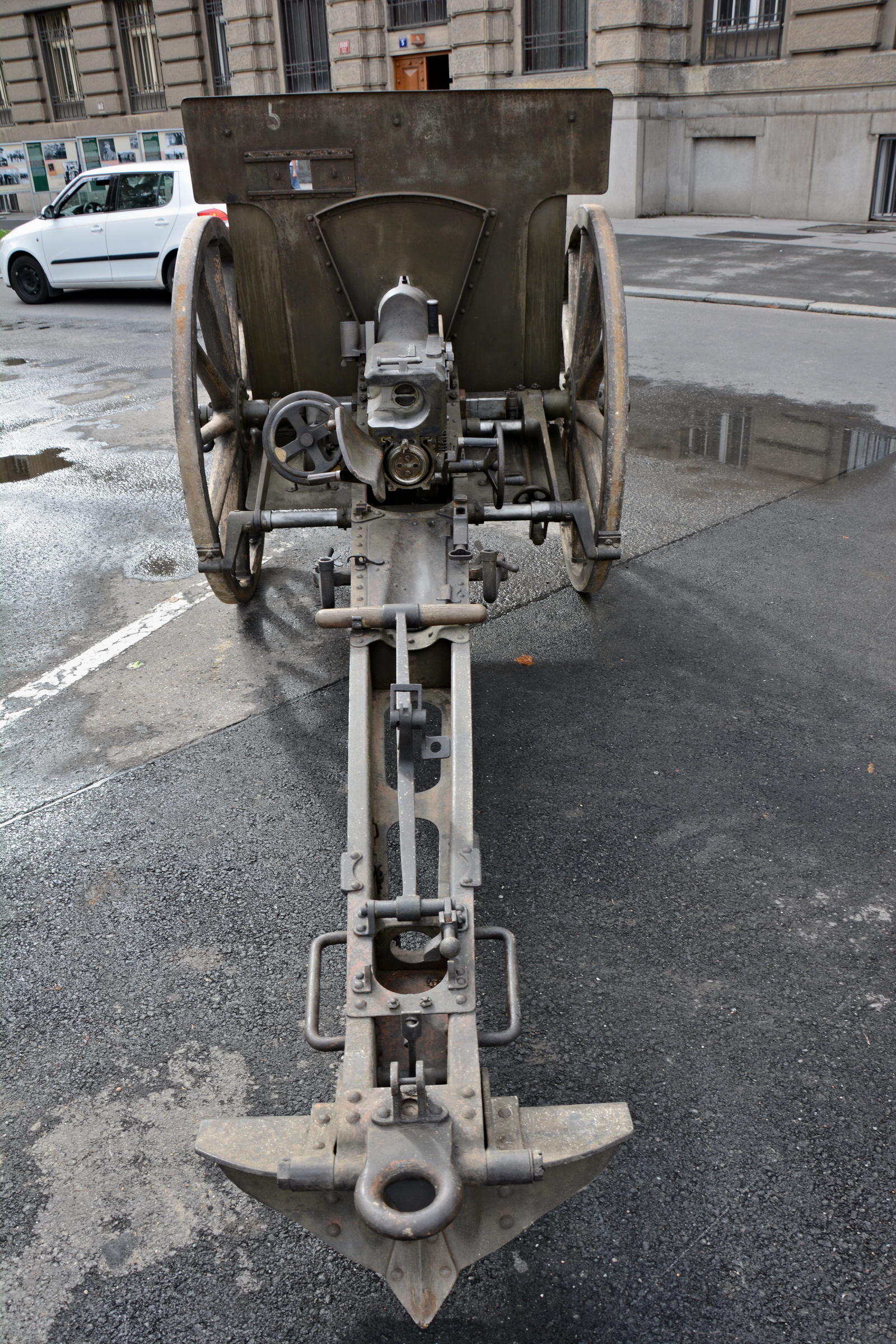

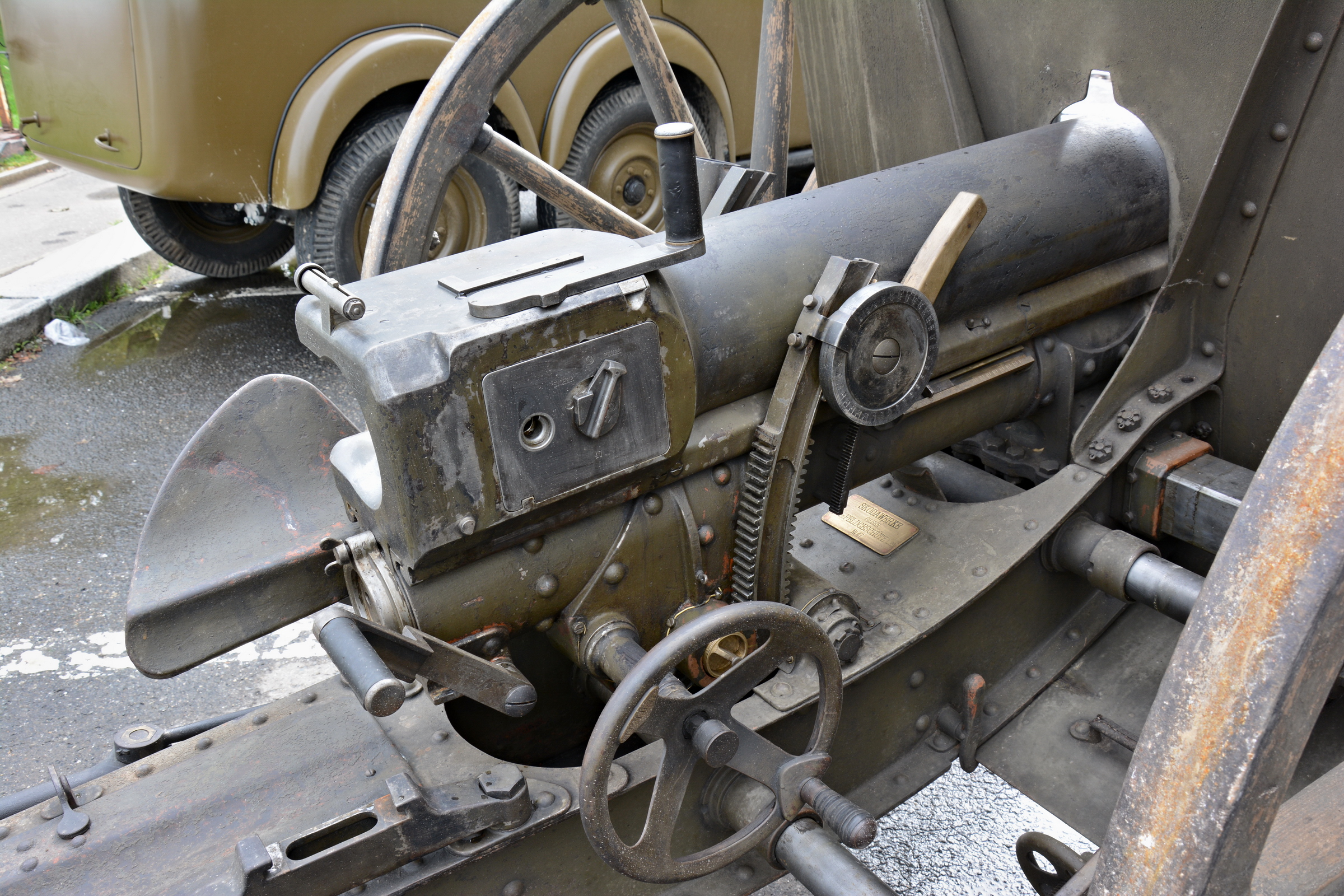

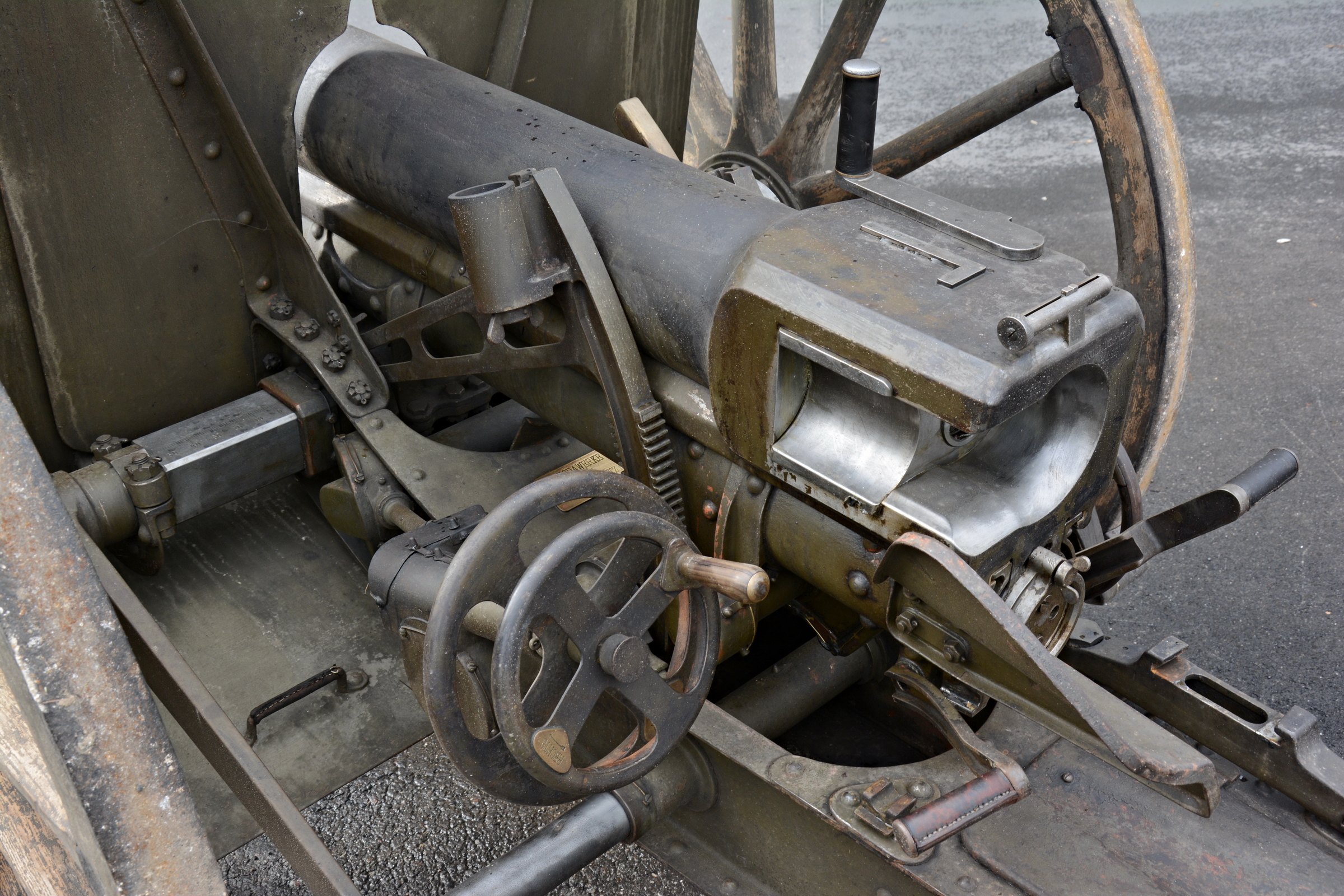

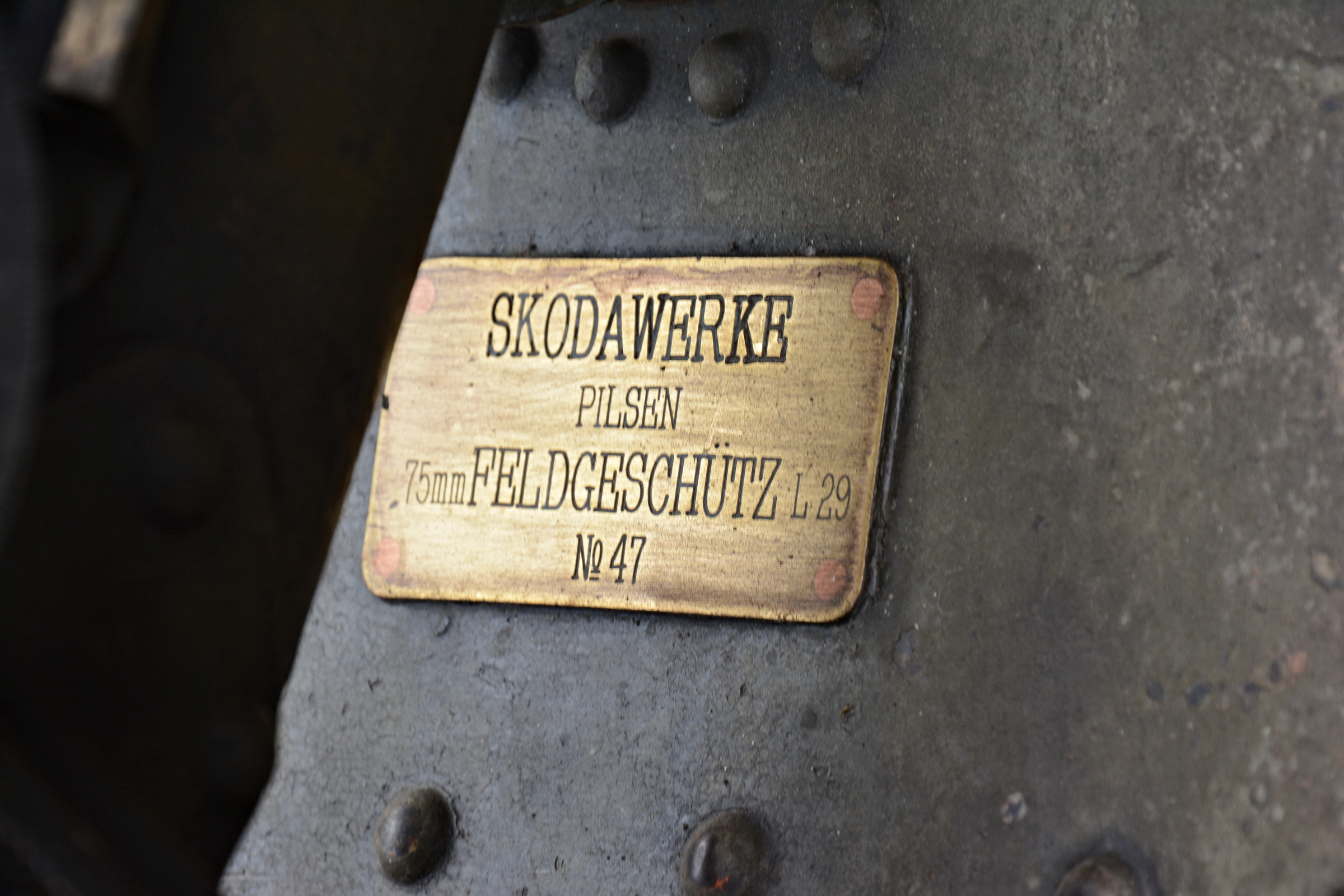

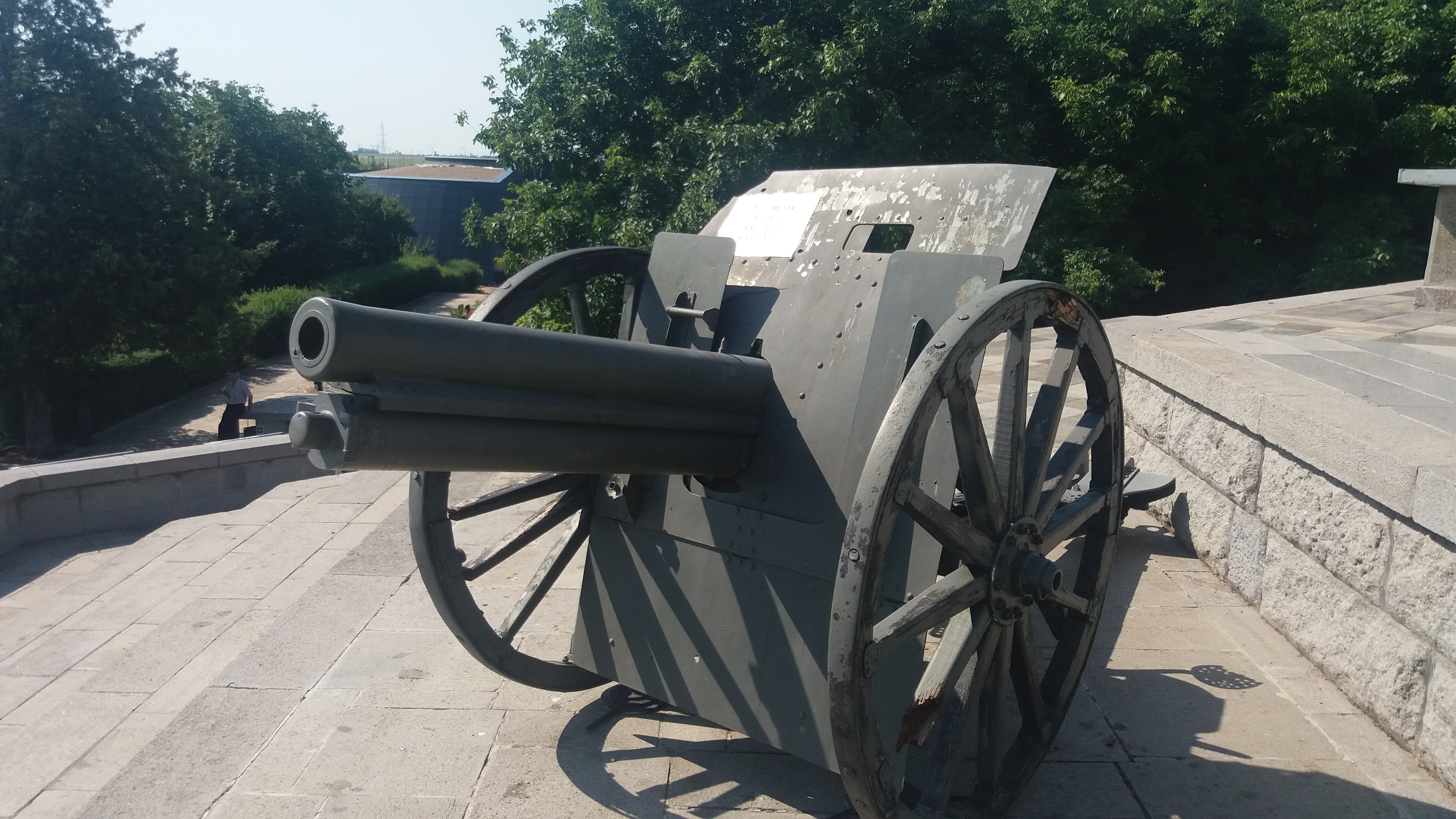
One of the guns at the Mausoleum of Mărășești, Romania

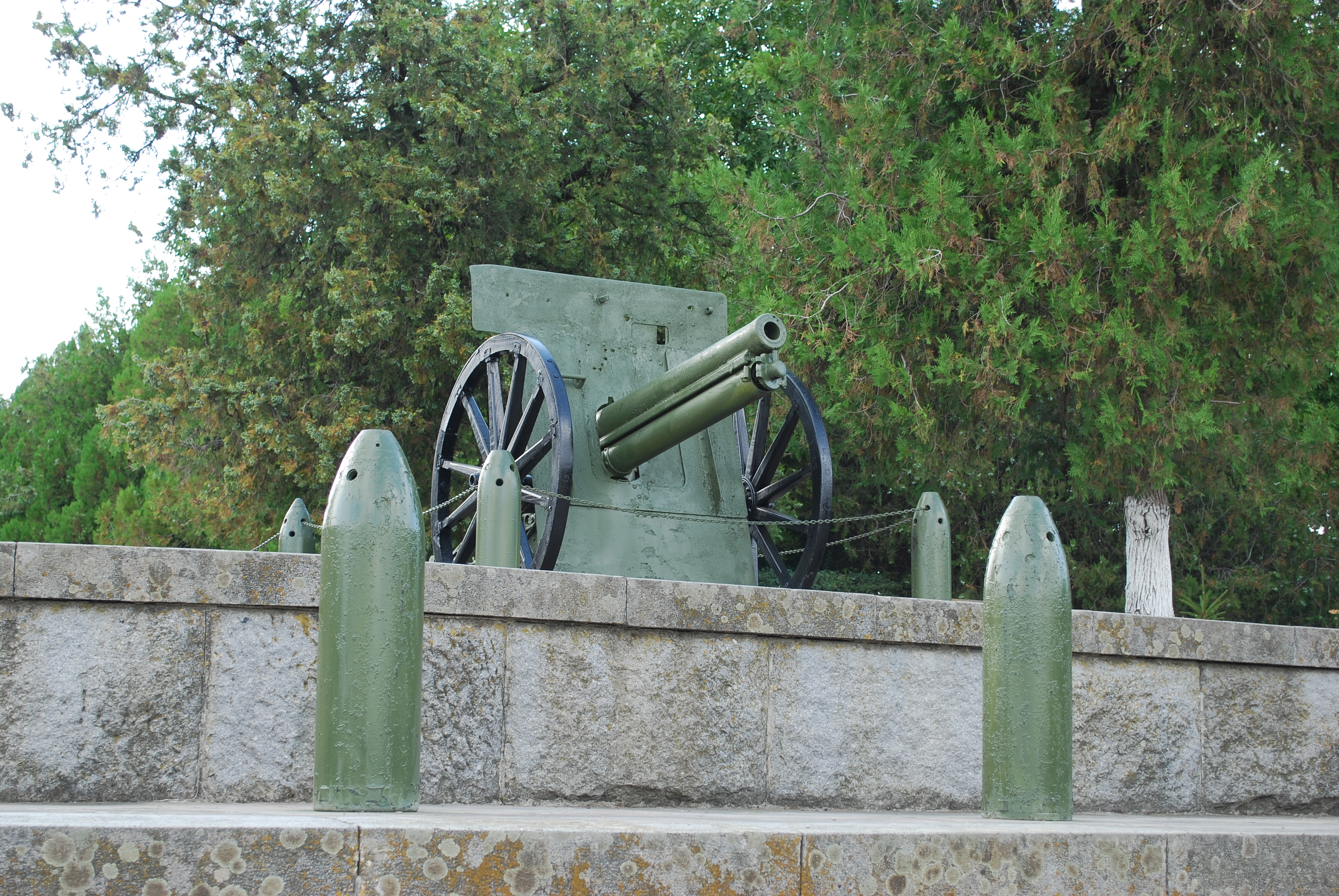
