= Škoda K series =

WWII Czechoslovak heavy howitzer

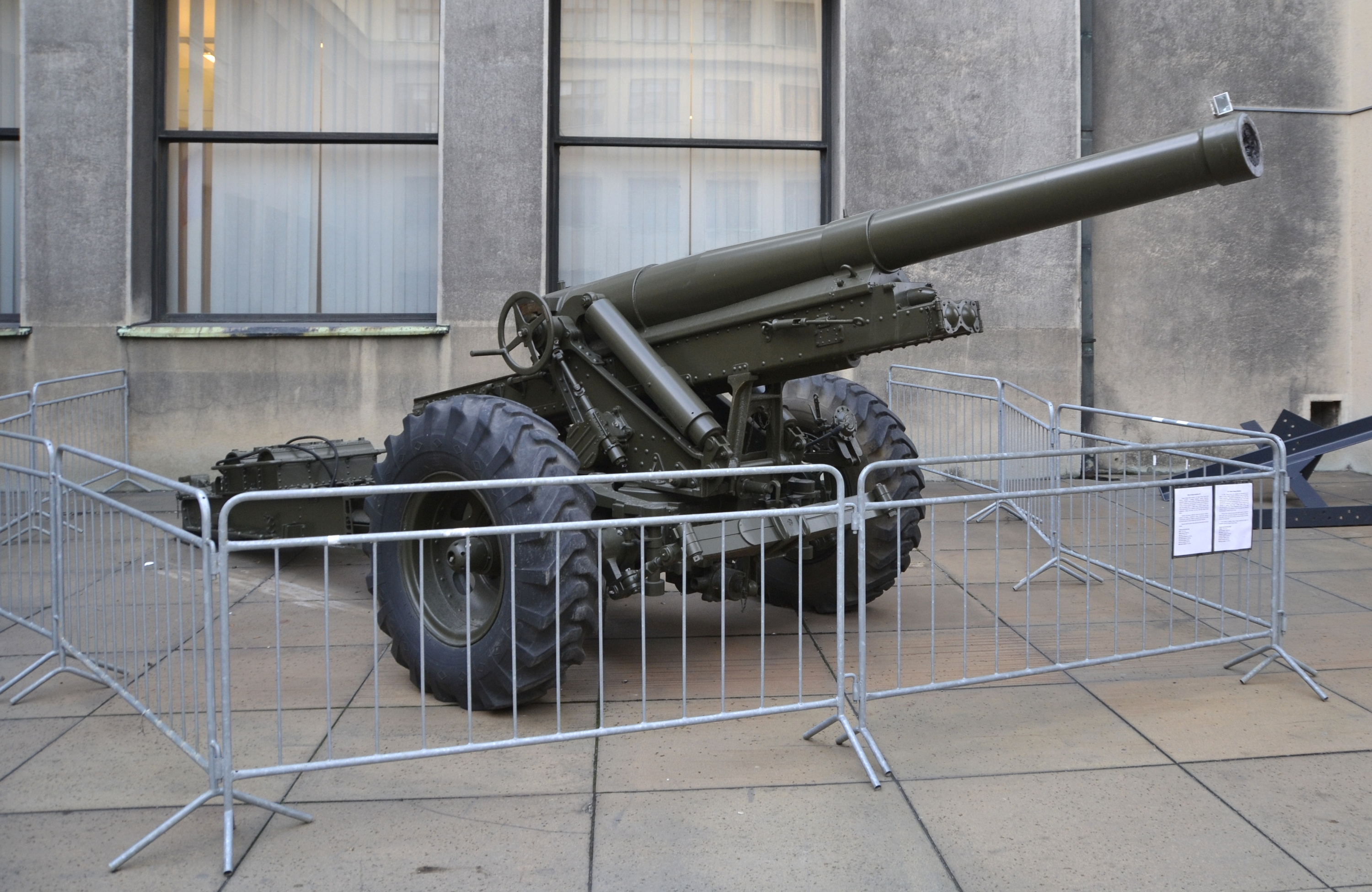
- K1 heavy howitzer near Army Museum Žizkov in Prague, Czech Republic
- Type: Heavy howitzer
- Place of origin: Czechoslovakia

Service history
- In service: 1933–1995
- Used by: Turkey; Kingdom of Romania; SFR Yugoslavia; Czechoslovakia; Nazi Germany; Slovakia
- Wars: World War II

Production history
- Designer: Škoda
- Manufacturer: Škoda
- Variants: 15 cm hrubá houfnice vz. 37

Specifications
- Mass: K1: 5,020 kg (11,070 lb); Vz. 37: 5,200 kg (11,500 lb)
- Barrel length: K1: 4.05 m (13 ft 3 in) L/27; Vz. 37: 3.6 m (11 ft 10 in) L/24
- Crew: 11
- Shell: 42 kg (93 lb)
- Caliber: 149.1 mm (5.87 in)
- Carriage: Split trail
- Elevation: -5° to +70°
- Traverse: 45°
- Muzzle velocity: K1: 570 metres per second (1,900 ft/s); Vz. 37: 580 m/s (1,900 ft/s)
- Maximum firing range: 15 km (9.3 mi)

The Škoda 149 mm K series was a line of heavy howitzer designs used by Germany, Turkey, Romania, Slovakia, and Yugoslavia during World War II.

== Description ==
The K-series howitzers were modern designs for their time, with a powerful 149.1 mm calibre barrel mounted on a heavy field carriage designed for motorized transport. The K1 model was slightly longer and could be disassembled for horse carrying as well. The K4 model was more modern and used pneumatic wheels as opposed to the K1's solid rubber rims. Both howitzers used spade plates that had to be pounded into the ground to anchor the weapon in place.

== History ==
The K series was an entirely new design by the Škoda Works company of Czechoslovakia. The original K1 model was in production by 1933, and was a successful export weapon, with sales to Turkey, Romania, and Yugoslavia. However, the Czechoslovak Army was not a buyer, but desired modifications to the weapon before any purchase. The newer weapon was titled the K4 and was accepted by the Czechoslovak Army as its standard heavy howitzer intended to replace the large variety of World War I era pieces still on inventory. In Czech service it received the designation 15 cm hrubá houfnice vzor 37 and had just begun production when Czechoslovakia capitulated to Germany in 1939. The Germans continued production for service in the Wehrmacht as the 15 cm schwere Feldhaubitze 37(t) or sFH 37(t). The weapon was widely used, particularly on the Eastern Front, and some had been supplied to Axis-allied powers such as Slovakia. Yugoslav K1 guns captured by Germany were given the designation sFH 402(j).

Romania purchased a total of 180 pieces between 1936 and 1939, designated as M34. Romania was not able to produce the whole piece by itself, but its Astra Works did manage to produce the gun barrel. Gun barrels of 150 mm were produced by Astra during the war for the replacement of damaged/worn-out barrels.

== Gallery ==
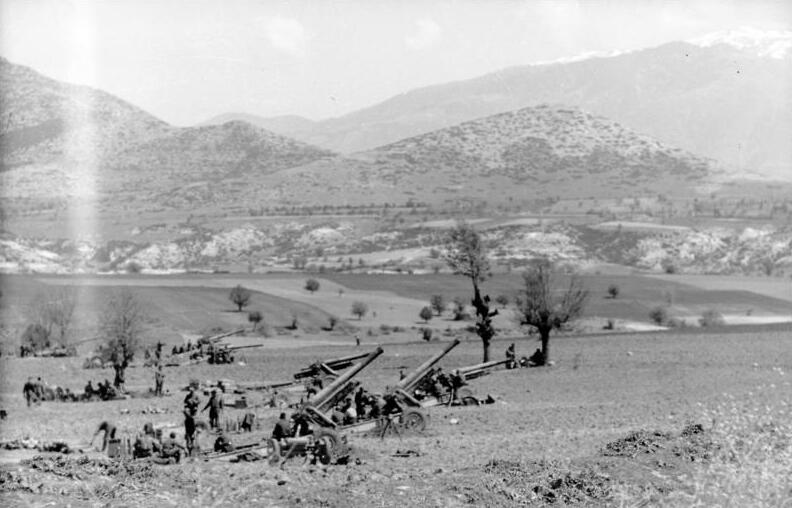
A battery of 15 cm sFH 37(t) in German service, Greece, 1941

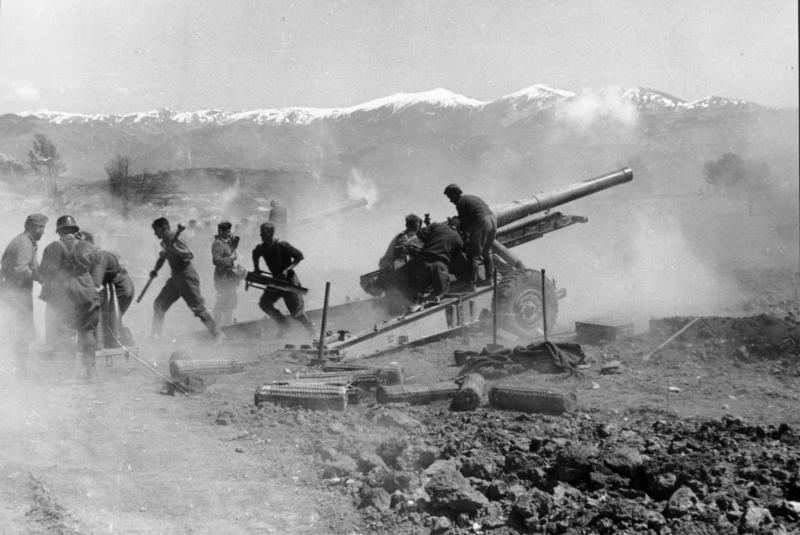
15 cm sFH 37(t) in German service, Greece, 1941

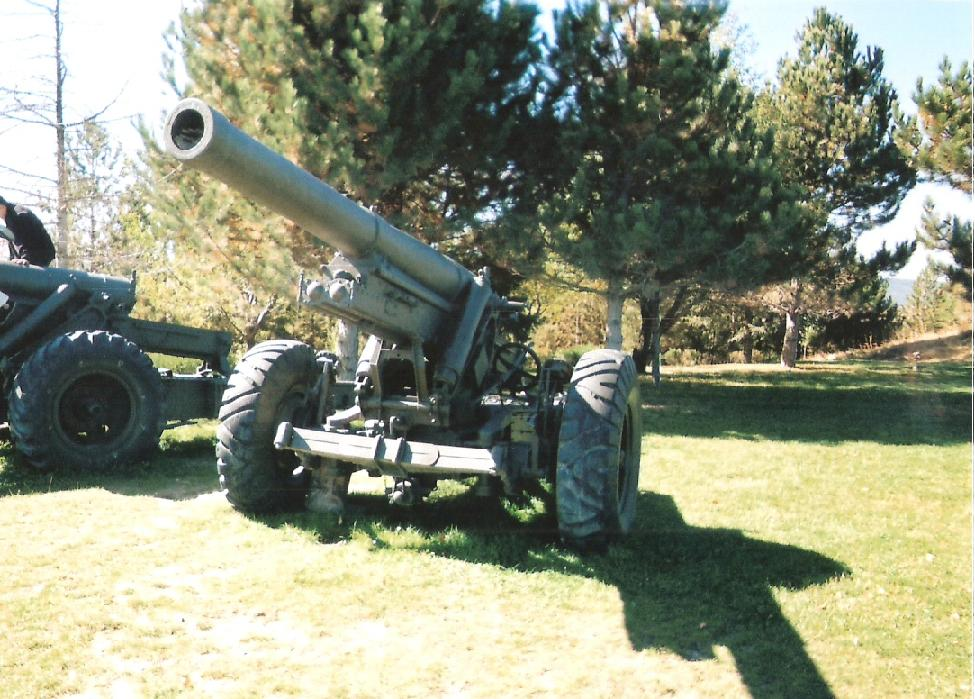
A Turkish howitzer

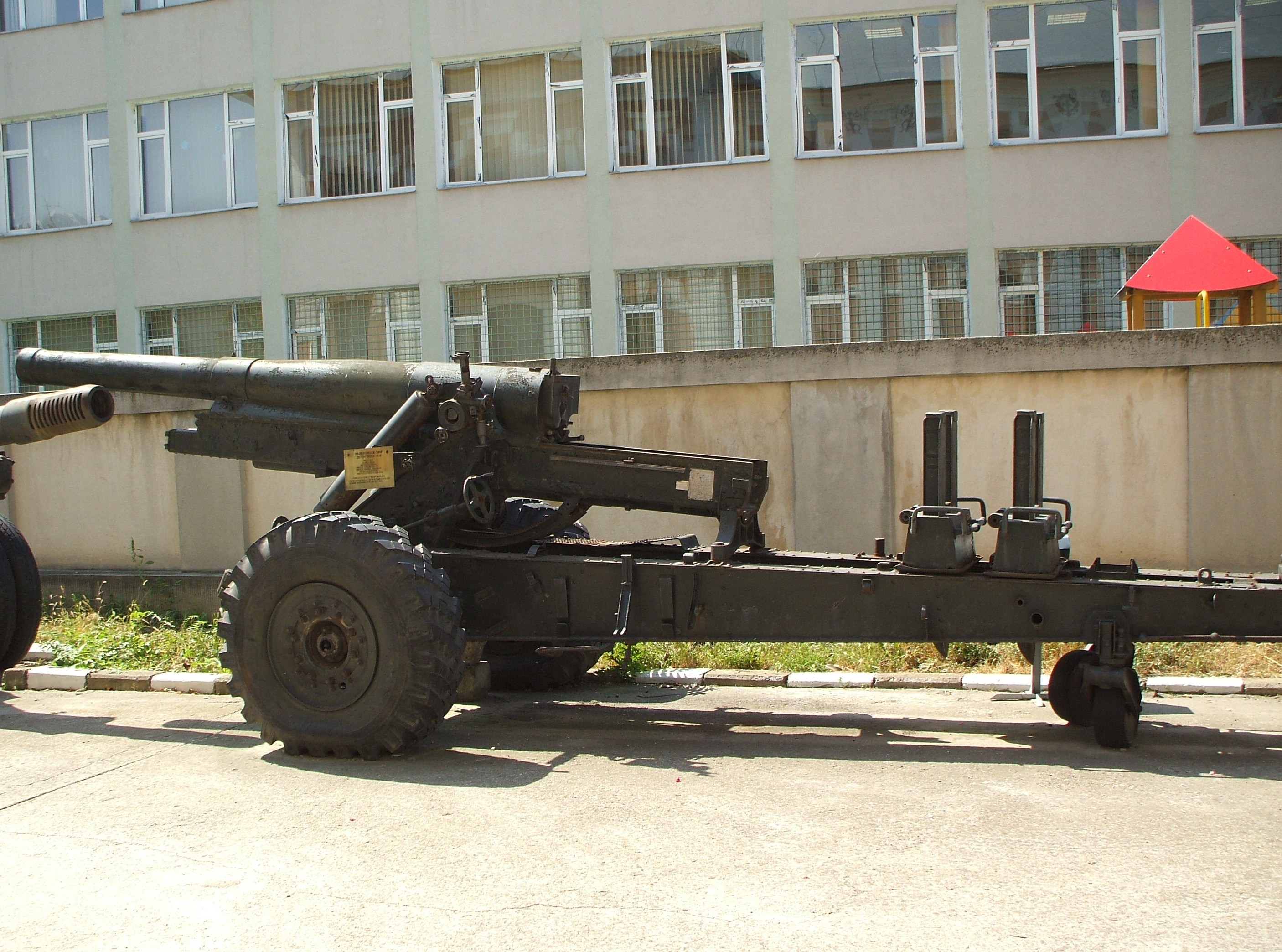
K1 howitzer (with postwar pneumatic wheels) in traveling position
