= 21 cm Kanone 39 =

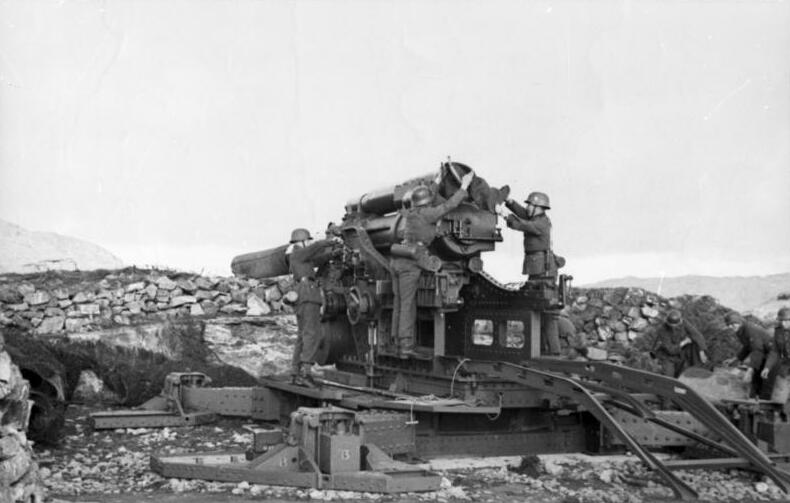
- A 21 cm K 39 in Norway on coastal defense duties
- Type: Heavy siege gun
- Place of origin: Czechoslovakia

Service history
- In service: 1939–45
- Used by: Nazi Germany; Turkey; Sweden
- Wars: World War II

Production history
- Designer: Škoda
- Manufacturer: Škoda
- Produced: 1939–44
- No. built: 60
- Variants: K 39/40, K 39/41

Specifications (21 cm Kanone 39/41)
- Mass: 39,800 kg (87,700 lb)
- Barrel length: 9.53 m (31 ft 3 in) (excludes muzzle brake)
- Shell: Separate-loading, bagged charge
- Shell weight: 135 kg (298 lb)
- Caliber: 210 mm (8.3 in)
- Breech: Interrupted screw, de Bange obduration
- Carriage: Box trail
- Elevation: -4° to +45°
- Traverse: 360°
- Rate of fire: 3 rounds in 2 minutes
- Muzzle velocity: 800–860 m/s (2,600–2,800 ft/s) (K 39 – K 39/40)
- Maximum firing range: 33 km (36,000 yd)
- Filling: TNT
- Filling weight: 18.8–21.7 kg (41 lb 7 oz – 47 lb 13 oz)

The 21 cm Kanone 39 (K 39) was a Czech-designed heavy gun used by the Germans in the Second World War. Two were built before the Germans occupied Czechoslovakia in March 1939 and seized the rest of the guns and kept it in production for their own use, eventually building a total of 60 guns for themselves. They saw action in Operation Barbarossa, the siege of Odessa, siege of Leningrad and the siege of Sevastopol and were used on coast defence duties.

== Development and design ==
It was designed by Škoda as a dual-purpose heavy field and coast defence gun in the late 1930s for Turkey with the designation of K52. Only two had been delivered before the rest of the production run was appropriated by the Heer upon the occupation of Czechoslovakia in March 1939.

Unlike the German practice of sliding block breeches that required a metallic cartridge case to seal the gun's chamber against combustion gases, Škoda preferred to use an interrupted screw breech with a de Bange obturator to seal the chamber. This lowered the rate of fire, but had the great economic advantage of allowing bagged propellant charges that didn't use heavy brass cartridge cases (copper might be in short supply in wartime). The other feature of the gun was that it used a monobloc autofrettaged barrel. This was a single piece of steel that was radially expanded under hydraulic pressure, a technology developed during WWI. This had the advantage of placing the steel of the barrel under compression, which helped it resist the stresses of firing and was simpler and faster to build since the barrel didn't require assembly as with more traditional construction techniques.

The box trail carriage revolved on a turntable that sat on a ball race on the firing platform and was capable of 360° traverse. The end of the carriage rested on rollers which rested on a metal track or rail. For transport the K 39 broke down into three loads, the barrel, the carriage and the firing platform with the turntable. Each of these was carried on a trailer with pneumatic tires. Emplacing the gun took six to eight hours, mainly to dig in and anchor the firing platform.

The story of the gun's development by the Germans is contradictory in the available sources. Hogg claims that the K 39/40 had only slight changes made, but that the K 39/41 added a muzzle brake to control recoil. Gander and Chamberlain say that the K 39/40 and K 39/41 both had muzzle brakes with better performance than the original K 39 and that the K 39/41 was introduced to simplify production. Sixty were built for the Germans.

During the war, nine of these guns were sold to Sweden, where they were used to equip three heavy mobile coastal batteries. The guns were part of the Swedish war organization until 1982, although training on them ceased in 1972.

=== Ammunition ===
Every shell used by the K 39 weighed 135 kilograms (298 lb). The original Czech 21 cm Gr 39 (t) high-explosive shell had both nose and base fuzes and a filling of 18.8 kilograms (41 lb) of TNT. The German equivalent, the 21 cm Gr 40, lacked the base fuze, had a copper driving band well forward on the shell and was fitted with a thin metal casing behind the driving band filled with a graphite mixture intended as a bore lubricant and to reduce wear. The 21 cm Gr 39 Be was a Czech-designed anti-concrete shell fitted with a base fuze, a ballistic cap and the additive sleeve. It was filled with 8.1 kilograms (18 lb) of TNT. There was also an armor-piercing, base-fuzed shell, the 21 cm Pzgr 39 of which little is known other than it had a filling of 2.8 kilograms (6.2 lb) of a PETN/wax mixture.

The K 39 used a three-part bagged charge that weighed a total of 37.5 kilograms (83 lb). The K 39/41 used a bagged charge with a total weight of 55 kilograms (121 lb) The base charge (Kleine Ladung) weighed 21.5 kilograms (47 lb) and had an igniter stitched to its base. The two increments (Vorkart) were lightly stitched together and enclosed in another bag tied at the top and with another igniter stitched to the base. The medium charge (Mittlere Ladung) consisted of the base charge and increment 2 while the full charge (Große Ladung) consisted of the base charge and both increments. The increments were loaded before the base charge.

== Operational history ==
The K 39 and its variants served as mobile artillery only with Artillery Battalions (Artillerie-Abteilungen) 767 and 768, each battalion being organized with 3 batteries, each with two guns. Both battalions were raised in April—May 1940, but it is unknown if either participated in the Battle of France. For Operation Barbarossa 767 was assigned to the Sixth Army of Army Group South where it participated in the sieges of Odessa and Sevastopol. 768 was initially assigned to 4th Army of Army Group Center, but it was quickly transferred to Army Group North to aid in the siege of Leningrad. By the start of Case Blue in late June 1942, Artillery Battalion 767 had been converted to smaller guns, but 768 was assigned to the 18th Army of Army Group North.

Seven K 39 guns were assigned to coast defence duties in Norway and nineteen K 39/40 guns were stationed in France (13) and Norway (6).

== Surviving examples ==
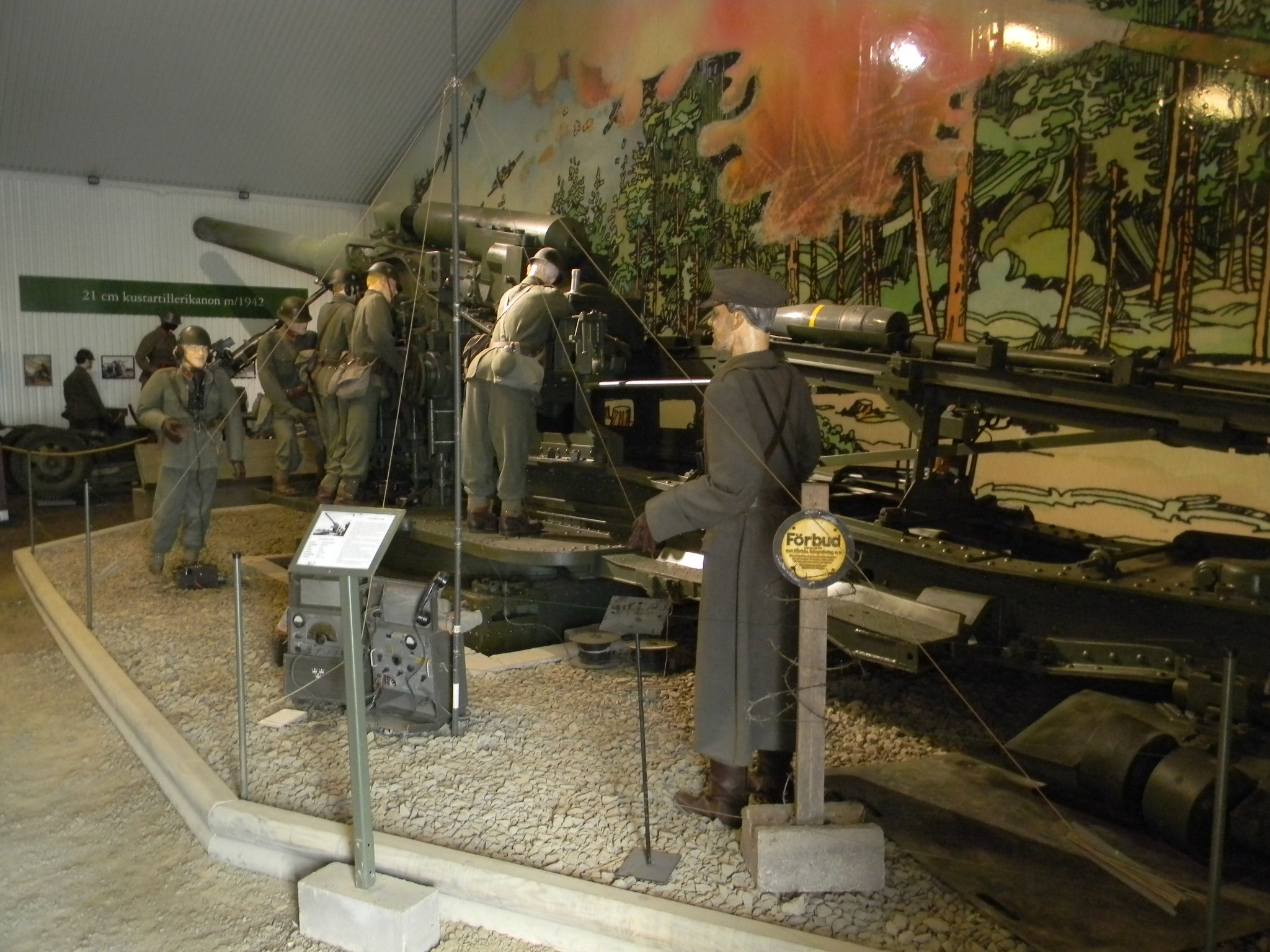
21 cm kustartillerikanon at the Beredskapsmuseet

Three examples are preserved as museum pieces in Sweden: on the island of Aspö; at Älvsborg, Gothenburg; and at the Military Preparedness Museum (Swedish: Beredskapsmuseet) outside Helsingborg.
