= Rosenergomash =

- Company type: Private company limited by shares
- Industry: Mechanical engineering Electrical engineering Power engineering
- Headquarters: Moscow
- Key people: Vladimir Palikhata, President; Vladimir Midza, CEO
- Products: Electrical generators
- Website: www.rosenergomash.ru

Rosenergomash is a Russian electro-mechanical manufacturer and operator, which owns or operates several plants in Ukraine and Russia. Corporate headquarters are in Moscow. The current President of the company is Vladimir Palikhata.

== Overview ==
- Large-Size Electric Machine Plant CJSC (ZKEM CJSC) the history of which includes over 40 years on the market of electric engineering products, was founded on the basis of a structural department of Yuzhelektromash OJSC. The plant is one of the leading Ukrainian enterprises in electrical engineering. Since 2000 and up to date over 20 new types of electric motors have been produced, which includes over 100 modifications.

Novaya Kakhovka, Kherson Oblast, Ukraine

- LLC “Novokakhovsky Electromechanic Plant” (formerly known as South Electric Machine Engineering Plant and afterwards — as OJSC “Yuzhelektromash”) was founded in 1955 in the newly built city Novaya Kakhovka and is one of the major manufacturers of asynchronous motors in the CIS countries.

Novaya Kakhovka, Kherson Oblast, Ukraine

- Elektromachina OJSC is one of the oldest Ukrainian mechanical engineering companies. For over 50 years the main products of the company have been direct current electric machines of 0.37 to 315 kW of any design and climatic modification, equipment for electric mine locomotives, traction locomotives, trolley and battery-driven locomotives, mine equipment, constant-voltage adjustable converters, complicated household appliances. The plant has an up-to-date experimental and research base and test production facilities. New product specimens are developed using automated design systems. The ISO 9001 complex system of product quality control is being successfully implemented. Today Elektromashina OJSC is a Ukrainian modern enterprise, the only one in this industry in terms of types and purpose of manufactured products.

Kharkiv, Ukraine

- ETAL Science and Production Association was established in Alexandria city (Kirovograd region). Currently, ETAL is one of the largest manufacturers of electrical products in CIS countries. In the beginning, it produced different electrical products, control panels, magnetic amplifiers. Production shops occupied 34 hectares.

Alexandria, Kirovohrad Oblast, Ukraine

- Kolomna heavy machine tool construction factory (KZHM) -- by the 1990s has become one of the biggest companies in the heavy machine construction industry of the USSR. Over the years the plant has produced dozens of modifications vertical- turning, special, rotary-grinding, hardening and woodworking machines and forging presses and other equipment. Products with the brand "ZTC" are well known in 48 countries.

Kolomna, Russia

== Production ==
=== Large-size electric machines ===
- Asynchronous electric motors
- Synchronous electric motors

=== Asynchronous electric motors conventional sizes 56-355 ===
- Three-phase asynchronous electric motors with squirrel-cage rotor
- Explosion-proof electric motors
- Electric Motors of special Purpose
- Generators

=== Direct-current electric machines ===
- Direct-current electric machines of general industrial and special use
- Marine design electric machines
- Electric machines for railroad transport
- Crane-metallurgy electric motors
- Mining direct current traction electric motors

=== Industrial electric equipment ===
- Mining electric equipment
- Normal resistors

== Social activity and charity ==
"Rosenergomash" is sponsor of the Russian Olympic Committee, participates in programs to support young gymnasts and children's ice-hockey.
