= Sibelektroprivod =

Sibelectroprivod
- Founded: 1961
- Headquarters: Novosibirsk, Russia
- Products: traction motors
- Website: ssep.ru

Sibelektroptivod (Russian: Сибэлектропривод) is a plant in Kirovsky District of Novosibirsk, Russia. It produces traction motors. The plant was founded in 1961.

== History ==
In September 1961, the plant manufactured the first traction motors for TE3, at the same time it produced trolleybus arrows for trolleybus line in Kirovsky District of Novosibirsk.

In 1964, the plant joined the Novosibirsk Electric Machine-Building Association named after XX Congress of the CPSU (future Sibelektrotyazhmash).

In 1987, the enterprise became separate organization, it was renamed "Sibstankoelectroprivod".

In 2004, the Russian Dedal Company and the Czech Škoda Holding signed an agreement on the organization of a new company on the basis of Sibstankoelectroprivod, it was called Sibelektroprivod.

In 2017, Sibelektroprivod and BelAZ signed an agreement on the production of engines for dump trucks with a carrying capacity of 90 tons.

== Products ==
The plant produces electric motors and generators for tractors, subway trains, commuter rails, dump trucks.

== Partnerships ==
The main partners of Sibelektroprivod are BelAZ, Mytishchi Machine-Building Plant, Chelyabinsk Tractor Plant, Vagonmash.

== Financial statistics ==
In 2003, the company's revenue amounted to 228 million rubles, loss amounted to 13.2 million rubles.
