= Zbrojovka Z 6 Hurvínek =

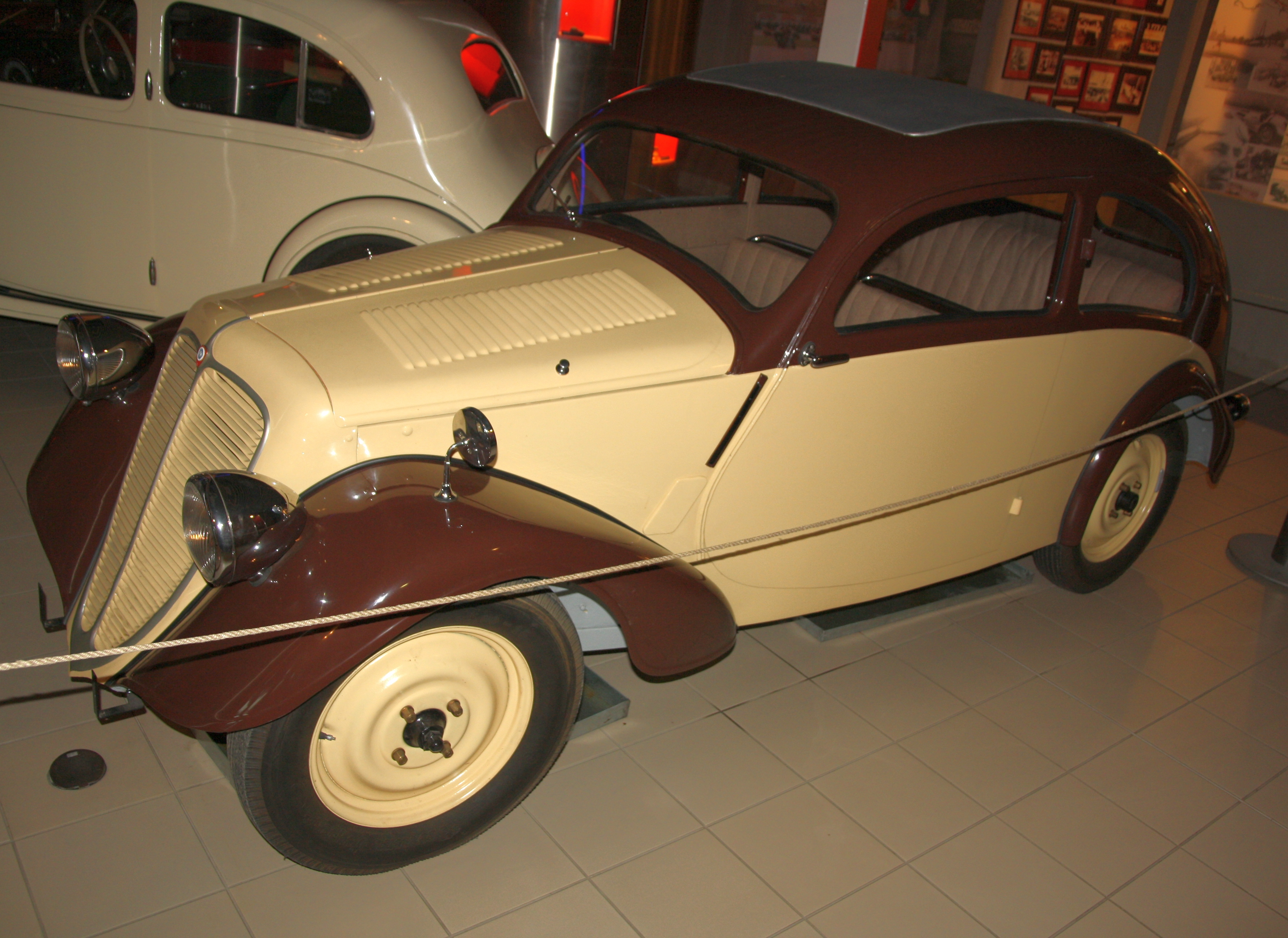
- 1935 Zbrojovka Z 6 Hurvínek

Overview
- Manufacturer: Československá Zbrojovka
- Production: 480
- Model years: 1935-1938
- Assembly: Czechoslovakia

Body and chassis
- Body style: Sedan
- Layout: Front-engine, front-wheel drive

Powertrain
- Engine: 14 kW (19 hp) 735 cc (44.9 in^{3}) two cylinder
- Transmission: 3 speed manual

Dimensions
- Wheelbase: 2,400 mm (94 in)
- Length: 3,760 mm (148 in)
- Width: 1,330 mm (52 in)
- Height: 1,430 mm (56 in)
- Kerb weight: 720 kg (1,590 lb)

The Zbrojovka Z 6 Hurvínek is a car produced by Československá Zbrojovka in the 1930s. Originally developed as a smaller vehicle for sale alongside the Z 4, 400 of the car were sold between 1935 and 1938. The car was of conventional design and powered by liquid-cooled two stroke two cylinder engine, which propelled it to a top speed of 90 km/h (56 mph). It had sufficient range to drive between Prague and Brno.

== Design ==
Designed as a smaller complement to the Zbrojovka Z 4, the Z 6 Hurvínek was a two-door sedan of conventional front-engine, front-wheel-drive layout. The production car used a liquid-cooled two stroke two cylinder 735 cc (44.9 in^{3}) engine with a bore of 90 mm (3 1/2 in) and stroke of 77 mm (3 in).

== Performance ==
The Z 5 Express could reach a top speed of 90 km/h (56 mph) and had a typical fuel consumption of between 8 L/100 km (35 mpg_{‑imp}; 29 mpg_{‑US}), which meant that the 20 L (4.4 imp gal; 5.3 US gal) fuel tank was sufficient to drive from Prague to Brno.

== Production ==
The car was announced in October 1935 at the Prague Motor Show and sales continued after the factory moved to military production from 1936, the last car being sold in 1938. 480 examples were sold at a price of 19,800 Kčs.

== See also ==
- Zbrojovka Z 6V
