= Zbrojovka Z 5 Express =

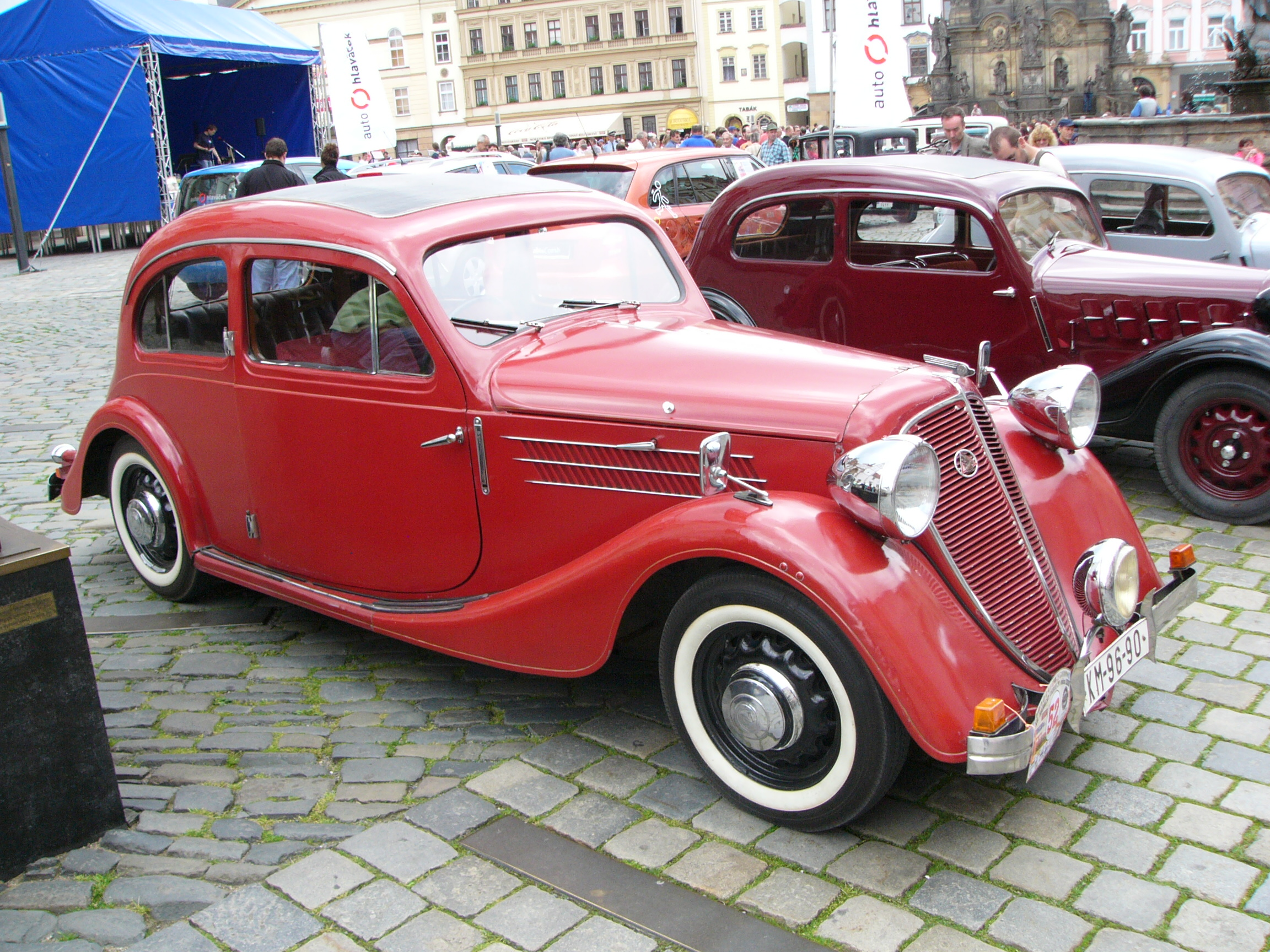
- 1936 Zbrojovka Z 5 Express

Overview
- Manufacturer: Československá Zbrojovka
- Production: 357
- Model years: 1935-1937
- Assembly: Czechoslovakia

Body and chassis
- Class: Mid-size
- Body style: sedan, convertible, roadster
- Layout: Front-engine, front-wheel drive

Powertrain
- Engine: 29 kW (39 hp) 1,470 cc (90 in^{3}) I4
- Transmission: 3 speed manual

Dimensions
- Wheelbase: 2,875 mm (113 in)
- Length: 4,400 mm (173 in) (sedan)
- Width: 1,450 mm (57 in) (sedan)
- Height: 1,560 mm (61 in) (sedan)
- Kerb weight: 1,040 kg (2,290 lb)

The Zbrojovka Z 5 Express is a car produced by Československá Zbrojovka in the 1930s. A more luxurious follow-on to the Z 4, the car was produced as both a sedan and sports car. 357 were produced between 1936 and 1938, including one used by Carol II of Romania and another by Alois Eliáš, Prime Minister of the Protectorate of Bohemia and Moravia.

== Design ==
In 1933, Zbrojovka tested a prototype four-cylinder car as a larger and more luxurious follow-on to the Z 4. The production car used a two stroke four cylinder 1,470 cc (90 in^{3}) engine with a bore of 90 mm (3 1/2 in) and stroke of 77 mm (3 in). Power was transmitted to the rear wheels through a 3-speed manual gearbox. Drum brakes were fitted front and rear, and suspension was by lower wishbones and upper transverse leaf springs.

The car was produced in a number of body styles, including a two-door sedan which cost 37,500 Kčs and a two-seat sports car that cost over 50,000 Kčs. They shared a wheelbase of 2,875 mm (113 in). The sedan had a length that measured 4,400 mm (173 in), a width of 1,450 mm (57 in) and a height of 1,560 mm (61 in). The kerb weight of the sedan was 1,040 kg (2,290 lb).

== Performance ==
The Z 5 Express could reach a top speed of 120 km/h (75 mph) and had a typical fuel consumption of between 11 and 13 L/100 km (26 and 22 mpg_{‑imp}; 21 and 18 mpg_{‑US}).

== Production ==
The car was announced in October 1935 at the Prague Motor Show and sales continued after the factory moved to military production from 1936, the last car being sold in 1938. 357 vehicles were manufactured.

== Notable examples ==
- Carol II of Romania used an example with a body designed by Plachý.
- The National Technical Museum (Prague) has preserved the vehicle used by Alois Eliáš, Prime Minister of the Protectorate of Bohemia and Moravia.
