= Z9 =

Z9 or Z-9 may refer to:

== Technology ==
- Motorola Z9, a cell phone model
- IBM System z9, a mainframe
- Nikon Z9, a full-frame mirrorless camera produced by Nikon

== Transportation ==
- BMW Z9, a concept car by BMW
- Denza Z9, an executive car by BYD Auto
- Dongfeng Z9, a Chinese mid-size pickup truck
- German destroyer Z9 Wolfgang Zenker
- MYAirline (former IATA code: Z9), a former Malaysian low-cost airline
- Aero Zambia (former IATA code: Z9), a former airline
- Harbin Z-9, a military Chinese aircraft
- Zbrojovka Z 9, a 1930s Czechoslovak car

== People ==
- Galindo Mellado Cruz (1973–2014), Mexican suspected drug lord known as Z-9

== See also ==
- 9Z (disambiguation)
