= Z4 =

The term/code Z4 has several uses, including the following:

== Aviation ==
- Z-4, U.S. Army designation for Hybrid Air Vehicles HAV 304/Airlander 10
- the IATA airline designator code for Zoom Airlines

== Automotive ==
- BMW Z4, a BMW sports car model
  - BMW Z4 (E85) - first generation
  - BMW Z4 (E89) - second generation
  - BMW Z4 (G29) - third generation
- Zbrojovka Z 4, a car made by Zbrojovka Brno
- Ziegler Z4, airport crash tender introduced in 2015

== Electronics ==
- Z4 (computer), the first computer in the world to actually be sold in 1950
- Sony Xperia Z4, a smartphone
- Moto Z4, a smartphone

== Military ==
- Z-4 plan, a plan that was meant to stop the Croatian War of Independence in 1994
- German destroyer Z4 Richard Beitzen
- Zerstörer 4 (D 178), Fletcher-class destroyer USS Claxton in post-WW2 service in the West Germany Navy
- Hafdasa Z-4, an Argentine submachine gun

== Other ==
- Line Z4, a Tianjin Metro line, China
- LNER Class Z4, a class of British steam locomotives

== See also ==
- 4Z (disambiguation)
