= ZB-50 =

- Type: Heavy machine gun
- Place of origin: Czechoslovakia

Production history
- Designed: 1932
- Manufacturer: Zbrojovka Brno

Specifications
- Cartridge: 8x57mm IS
- Caliber: 7.9mm
- Action: Recoil
- Feed system: Belt
- Sights: Iron

The ZB-50 is a heavy machine gun of Czechoslovak origin. It was the only recoil-operated weapon of its type from the ZB company.

== Users ==
- Argentina
- Czechoslovakia
