= Zbrojovka Z 6V =

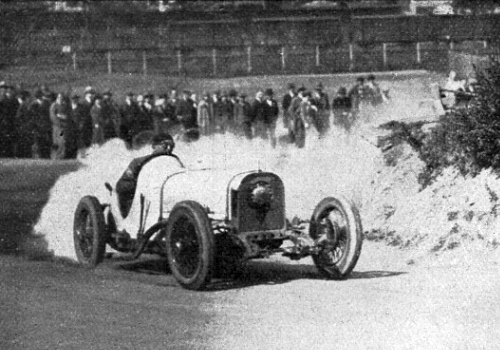
- Bedřich Soffer drives a Z6V racing car in the Brno-Soběšice race (1928)

Overview
- Manufacturer: Zbrojovka Brno
- Production: 1927–1929

The Zbrojovka Z 6V is a racing car that was produced from 1927 to 1929 by the company Zbrojovka Brno. (Note: In some sources, the Z 6V is referred to as the Z 2 with a M 2 engine.) It was the first Czechoslovak car to be equipped with a supercharger. The new Z 6V was nicknamed "the Inferno" for its stunning roar and plumes of smoke from its supercharged two-stroke engine.

== History ==
After the victory of the Brno-based Zbrojovka Z 18 Sport in the second year of the up to 1100 cm ^{3} class race at the Pradědský circuit near Karlova Studánky on June 19, 1927, the graduate of Brno Technical University engineer František Mackrle (Note: constructor in Zbrojovce since 1924, and since 1928 as construction manager) started to work on a real racing engine for a racing car that would bring the company more success. Mackrle turned to Ing. Josef Kožousek from Brno technology, who helped build the new engine, and thus a two-stroke, in-line, turbocharged, six-cylinder engine with counter-rotating pistons was created. Similar engines were produced by, for example, the German company Junkers. The car with this engine had promising results. The Z 6V reached a top speed of around 175 km/h (109 mph) and had very good acceleration but also had problems such as a tendency to burn through the bottom of the pistons controlling the exhaust port. The car was unsuitable for long and demanding races. The car racer Bedřich Soffer was supposed to help solve these problems. who was testing the car before the Ecce Homo race, which took place on September 16, 1928. During a test drive on September 5, Soffer crashed and died in the accident. Mackrle took this tragedy personally; he was already very embittered by the accident of his friend Čeňko Junko in the summer of that year at the Nürburgring in Germany. The death of Bedřich Soffer led Ing. Mackrle to resign as chief designer in Zbrojovka. He went to Škoda Works in Plzeň, where he worked until the occupation.

== Technical description ==
The 6V was a two-seater sports-racing car. The M2 engine developed in 1927 was located at the front and the car had rear-wheel drive. It had a two-stroke, inline, six-cylinder engine with counter-rotating pistons with a cylinder displacement of 1085 cm^{3} (Note: bore 48 mm, stroke 50 mm, i.e. total stroke of both cylinders 100 mm).) The engine did not have a cylinder head. The engine block was equipped with two crankshafts connected by a toothed gear, allowing the intake and exhaust to be controlled by the edges of the pistons with a small offset. The pistons in the upper dead center defined the combustion space against each other. The fuel mixture, which was ignited by twelve Champion spark plugs connected to two Scintilla aviation magnetos located transversely by the flywheel, was prepared by two Zenith TD 30 triple-diffuser carburetors. The engine was cooled by liquid with forced circulation. Supercharging was achieved by two-vane compressors mounted on either end of the upper crankshaft; these were originally Zoller vane compressors but after a later conversion, two Roots compressors were used. The oversized Zoller supercharger characteristically ran through the front and protruded in front of the radiator.

With an output of 55 kW (75 hp) at 5,500 rpm and a three-speed gearbox with reverse gear (3+Z), the car reached a maximum speed of 175–180 km/h (109–112 mph). The car was powerful but had an unreliable engine with a tendency to burn pistons. The spark plugs and pistons of the engine were very difficult and slow to cool, and usually after some time the pistons burned out, so the car mostly raced on short tracks. The car's body was made of aluminum sheet on a wooden frame. The chassis had a rectangular, ladder-frame design that was riveted from pressed-steel U-sections. The solid-axle car was suspended by longitudinal leaf springs and Hartford friction dampers. The wheels were Rudge & Whitworth wire and the brakes were mechanical, drum with balancer. The wheels were fitted with 4.95x28 tires.

== Competition history ==
According to unconfirmed reports, the engine of this Z 6V car was supposed to have been used for the first time in the second year of the Praděd Circuit (June 19, 1927). The Zbrojovka Brno factory team started with three cars. Rychard Müttermüller won the laurel in the category up to 1.1 liter, which was run for 10 laps (224 km (139 mi)) for Zbrojovka from Brno in a time of 3:06:15.7 hours. Zetka's success was completed by the third place of Karel Stohanzl, racing from that date under the pseudonym "Flieger", and the sixth place of Bedřich Soffer, who drove the fastest lap of the class in 18:10.9 minutes. All drivers drove the Z 18 Sport type, but Soffer's car was fitted with the new Z 2 engine, a 1,085 cc, two-stroke, turbocharged, six-cylinder with a displacement of 1,085 cc, designated M2. This engine was later fitted to the Z 6V sports-racing special. Soffer finished in sixth place, although in the third lap he rammed into Káš's Imperia, which skidded and remained standing across the road. Soffer saved himself by braking hard, the car went into a skid and his front tire burst. The repair cost Soffer three laps the others missed. He finished the race more than 65 minutes behind the winner.

The car's first confirmed start was in the fifth year of the Czechoslovak Automobile Club for Moravia and Silesia (ČAMS) club race to the Brno-Soběšice hill on May 13, 1928. Cars from Zbrojovka from Brno won in three categories. The latter sent to the race one Z 6V car with a six-cylinder, two-stroke engine (M2) with a displacement of 1,085 cm^{3} with two compressors (Bedřich Soffer), and two two-stroke, two-cylinder cars with a Z 4V compressor (Rychard Müttermüller and Karl "Flieger" Stohanzl). Although these cars were still being trialed when they were sent to the race, they won for the first time in the hands of excellent drivers. In the category of racing cars up to 1.1 l, Soffer won without competition in his category and set a new track record for this class in a time of 2:53.6 min. Third place in this class was taken by Leo Karger on Zetka. "Flieger" with Müttermüller took the first two places in the sports cars class up to 1.1 l on the Z 4V (M6 engine - two-piston two-stroke two-cylinder, longitudinally doubled, displacement 0.995 l, max. output 34 kW/46 hp). "Flieger" broke the record for this class with its performance. Zbrojovka's success was completed by the first three places in touring cars from 18 to 1,000 cc, where the drivers behind Zetky occupied the podium in the order of Karel Divíšek, Jar. Najman and engineer Václavíková-Zichová.

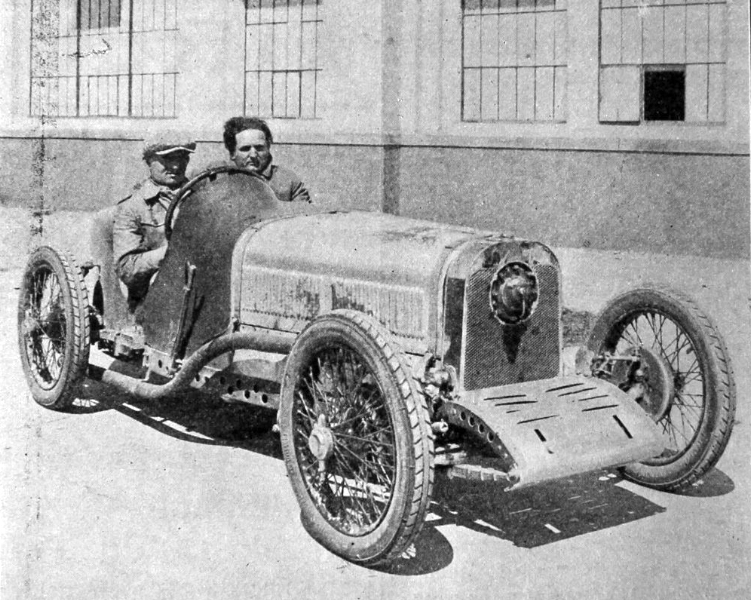
Bedřich Soffer on the six-cylinder Z 6V (1928)

Until the third year of the Praděd circuit (June 3, 1928), Zbrojovka sent seven riders, most of whom drove new six-cylinders with Z 6V compressors or two-cylinders with Z 4V compressors. Karl "Flieger" Stohanzl already looked certain to win in a Zetka. He was leading after the 10th lap, with only two laps to go. His car broke down, which eliminated him from the race and allowed Liebig to win at Amilcar (12 laps/268.8 km (167.0 mi)). This category had a serious accident. Soffer skidded in a corner, smashing the car and two spectators' motorcycles with the back of his car. His mechanic suffered a broken leg. But the drunkard who was sleeping almost the spot of the accident, escaped unscathed and apparently only woke up after accident had taken place, Národní listy wrote. Liebig in an Amilcar won in 3:38:35.8 min ahead of Arnošt Procházka, Josef Mamula, Vodička and Karel Divíšek in Zetky (2nd-5th place). The honorary award of the Ministry of National Defense for the fastest lap (in the third lap) of a Czechoslovak-made car was awarded to Leo Karger in a Z 6V, which he drove in 16:03.7 min (82.2 km/h (51.1 mph)). Of the seven armored vehicles at the start, five were classified. The race (VIII open race to the Schöber hill) took place on June 17, 1928. 46 vehicles were entered, of which 40 started and 38 reached the finish line. Of the Czechoslovak factories, only Zbrojovka Brno officially participated in the race. In sports cars up to 1.1 l and in the category of sports cars of all classes, Karl Stohanzl on Z 4V won in 3:13.6 minutes, and in racing cars up to 1.1 l, Josef Mamula won in 3:15.6 min on Z 6V and won the Schöbru silver cup.

For the fifth year of the national race to Knovíz-Olšany hill (June 24, 1928), 39 vehicles started, including 21 motorcycles, 6 sidecars and 12 cars. In racing cars up to 1.1 l, Bedřich Soffer won at Z 6V in 2:37.4 min, and in sports cars up to 1.1 l at Z 4V, Josef Mamula, who broke Soffer's 1927 record from Sénéchal. Overall, the Junks won the race. Both started in Bugatti racing cars under 2 l: Čeněk in 2:08 min. and Eliška 2:13.5 min. After a one-year break due to track repairs, on April 28, 1929, the 12th edition of the international race to the Zbraslav-Jíloviště hill attracted 100,000 spectators. This year also brought new records in a number of categories. In sports cars from 750 to 1,100 cc (category G), Karl "Flieger" Stohanzl won at Z 4V in 3:52.4 min and set a category G record, for which he received a crystal cup from the organizer of the event (AKRČs). Anton Kahle with the Z 6V also won in his class of racing cars up to 1100 cc, also in the category record.

Brněnská Zbrojovka commissioned engineer Vladimír Souček, who joined Zbrojovka on January 1, 1929, after the departure of engineer Mackrle, to rework the Z 6V and prepare it for the race at the Grand Prix of the Sports Car Nations, which took place at the German circuit Nürburgring on July 14, 1929. The Z 6V was lowered, the engine was moved slightly back so the compressor no longer extruded from the radiator, and the suspension of the axles and the brake system were redesigned. It was fitted with dual Bosch magneto ignition, new Roots superchargers and the stressed pistons were cast with a copper cooling liner. In the class from 750 to 1500 cm^{3}, Ernst (Arnošt) Procházka-Karel Divíšek started in a Z 4V (st. no. 50) and in 2 Z 6V cars Karl "Flieger" Stohanzl-Anton Kahle (st. no. 54) and Josef Mamula (st. no. 56). The race lasted 18 laps (508.77 km (316.14 mi)). The factory driver Karl Stohanzl led his category for almost the entire race, but in the penultimate lap, his pistons blew again. Josef Mamula with the second car finished with a dislocated gimbal bearing, which prevented him from shifting gears, and wet with hot oil in second place in the category, but unfortunately after the time limit so he could not be classified. Karel "Tunal" Divíšek finished third in Z 4V but due to a defect also after the time limit. (Note: According to other sources, Stohanzl finished with a blown piston after the time limit and Mamula dropped out with a gearbox fault after lap four. Zbrojovka's board of directors felt the failure so strongly it immediately sold both Z 6V cars to private individuals and intended to abandon racing activities for good.)

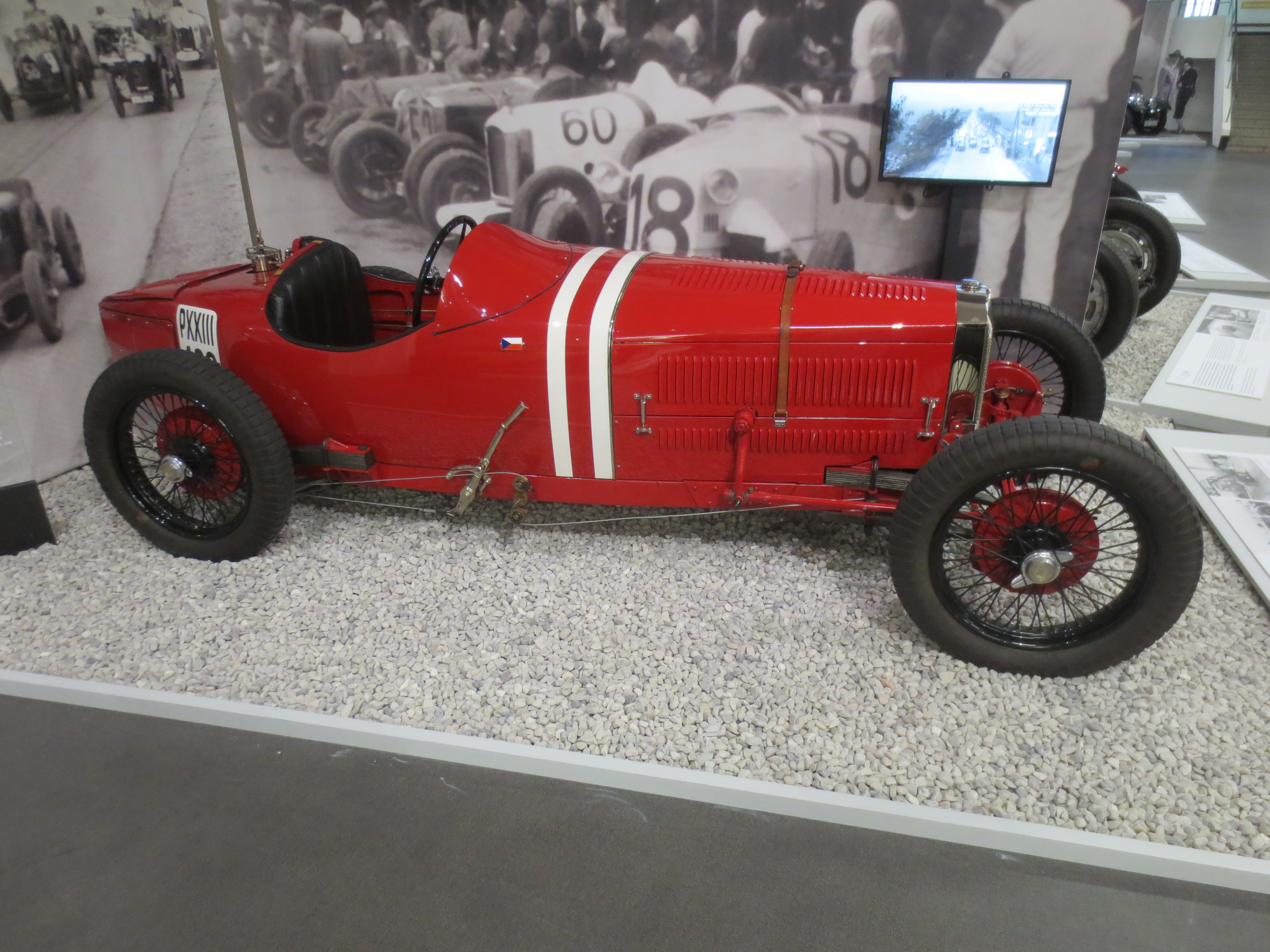
Armored car Z-S30 (1930), at the exhibition Laurels with the smell of gasoline in the National Technical Museum in Prague (2021)

After the failure at the Grand Prix of Nations at the Nürburgring and the death of Bedřich Soffer, Zbrojovka stopped the entire Z 6V/Z 2 and Z 4V project and sold the produced prototypes to private persons. On September 22, 1929, Karel Divíšek in his blue Z 4V won the category of racing cars up to 1,100 cm^{3} in the race to the Ecce Homo hill and set a track record for this category. Divíšek initiated the creation in 1930 of later Zbrojovka racing cars with the engines of engineer Vladimír Souček M8 (Z-S30) and M15 (Z13 or Z 14).

The engineless Z 6V was sold to Antonín Beránek, who gradually installed six different engines in it and raced it on circuits and uphill races, but without much success. The car was converted again to BZV6 and was equipped with a Vauxhall K14 engine and others. His biggest success with the built-in Bugatti engine was second place in the under 1,500cc class, respectively sixth place in the racing-car category (19th overall) in the 1936 Ecce Homo hill race. On September 5, 1937, E. Laufka took second place in racing cars at the 17th Ecce Homo in Šternberk with this car, finishing behind Florian Schmidt in a Bugatti T51A and ahead of Bruno Sojka (Bugatti T37A).
