= 9Z =

9Z or 9-Z may refer to:

- (9Z)-octadecenoic acid; see Oleic acid
- Salmson 9 Z, a model of Salmson 9 aircraft
- Clerget 9Z, a model of Clerget-Blin aircraft engine

== See also ==
- Z9 (disambiguation)
