= 4Z =

4Z or 4-Z may refer to:

- 4Z, IATA code Airlink
- 4Z, the production code for the 1978 Doctor Who serial The Invasion of Time
- 4Z series, a 4-Cylinder engine by Isuzu
- 4Z, Squadron code for No. 1699 Flight RAF (1699 Flt); see List of RAF Squadron Codes
- 4Z, Squadron code for No. 1699 Conversion Unit (1699 CU); see List of RAF Squadron Codes
- 4Z, Squadron code for Bomber Command Communication Squadron (BC Comm Sqn); see List of RAF Squadron Codes

== See also ==
- Z4 (disambiguation)
