= Zbrojovka Brno =

Czech firearm and vehicle manufacturer

Zbrojovka Brno, s.r.o.
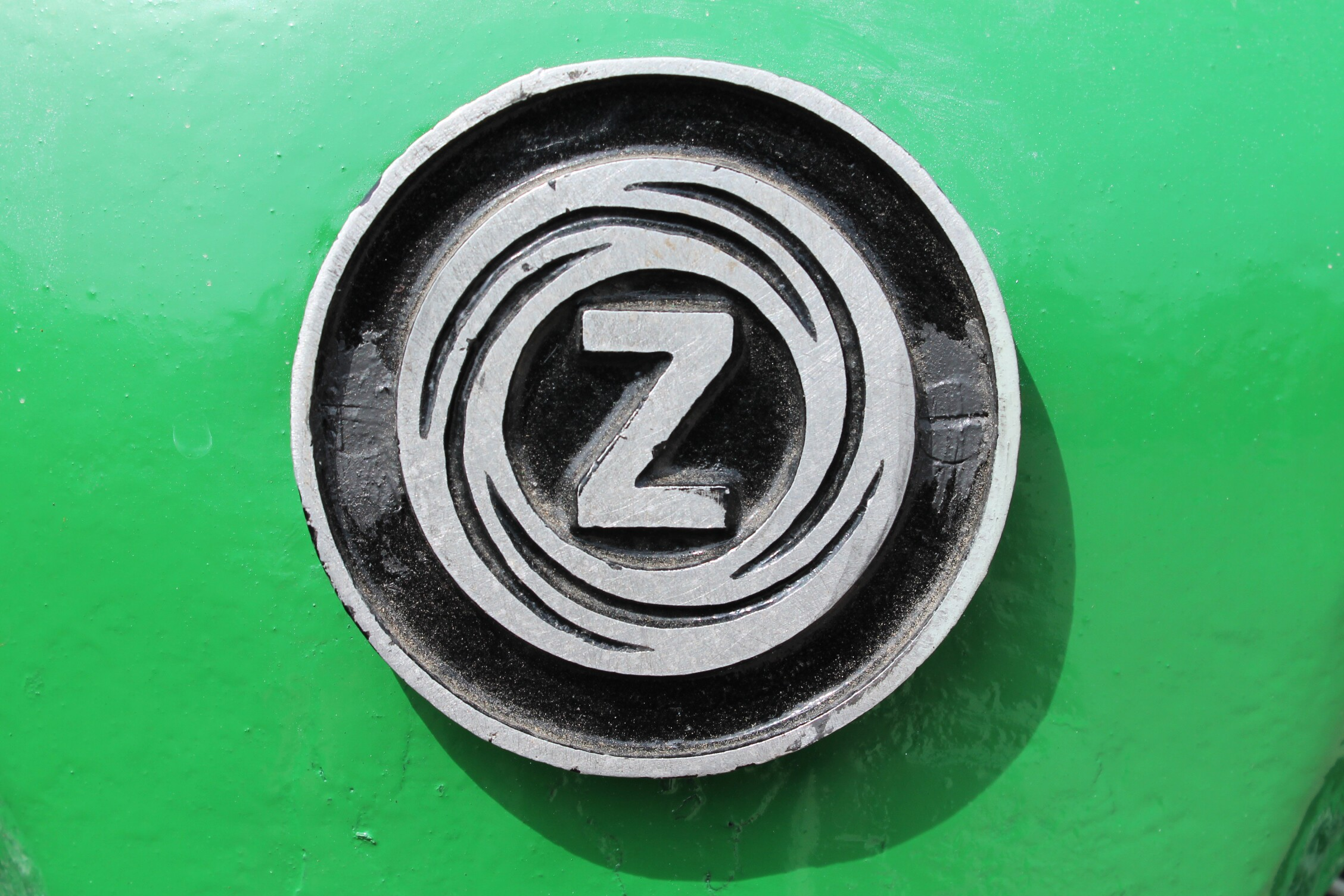
- Company type: Private limited company
- Industry: Firearm
- Headquarters: Brno, Czech Republic
- Parent: Colt-CZ Group
- Website: www.coltczgroup.com

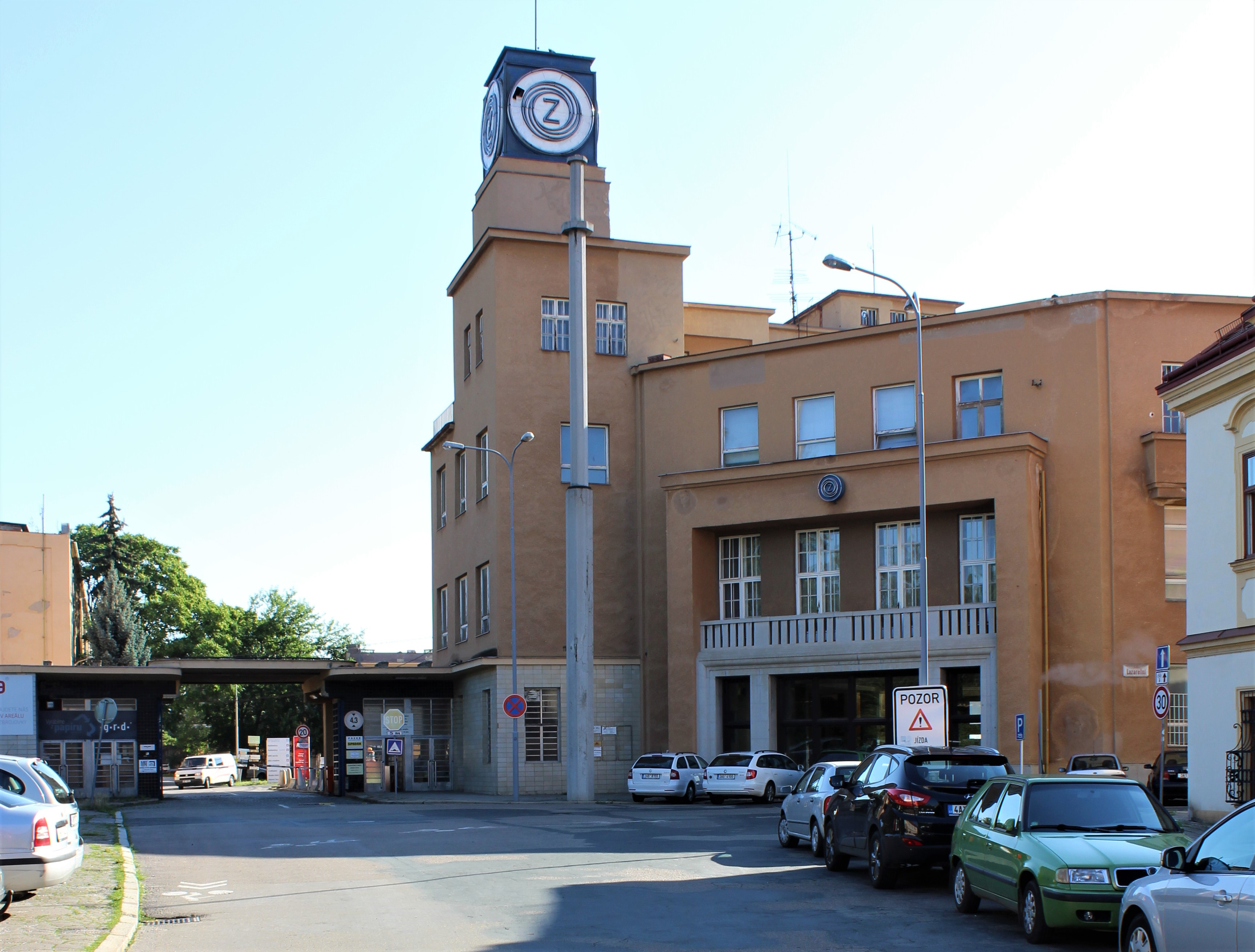
Zbrojovka Brno headquarters and gateway

Zbrojovka Brno, s.r.o. is a small arms manufacturer based in Brno, Czech Republic. It's a wholly owned subsidiary of Colt-CZ Group.

The company name roughly translates to "Arsenal Brno". In the past, it was highly diversified and produced a wide range of products, including kitchen appliances, scales, sewing and cutting machines, as well as machine guns, light artillery, passenger cars, motorcycles, tractors, and office equipment such as typewriters, keyboards, teleprinters, and computers.

In 1946, Zbrojovka started manufacturing tractors under the brand name Zetor. Tractors became some of its most successful products, and Zetor was later spun off into a separate company that continues to operate on the site of the former Brno Zweigwerk factory in Brno-Líšeň.

== History ==
The company was founded in 1918 as a state-owned enterprise named State Armament and Engineering Works. The factory assembled German Gewehr 98 and Austrian Mannlicher M1895 rifles, but later began producing its own designs. Between 1924 and 1925, a new factory was built, where cars, engines, and other machinery were produced in addition to rifles and machine guns. From the 1930s, the factory also produced typewriters under a license from Remington and tractors under a license from Škoda.

During the German occupation of Czechoslovakia, Zbrojovka Brno was renamed Waffenwerke Brünn and produced weapons for the Nazi war effort. In 1944, the factory was severely damaged in the Allied bombing of Brno. It resumed production after the war ended. By the late 1940s, Zbrojovka was making engines, weapons, and tractors. In November 1945, a prototype of a new tractor, named Zetor Z25, was delivered in response to a government requisition to design and mass-produce a lightweight tractor. Its name is derived from "Zet" for Zbrojovka and "or" for tractor. In the 1980s, the company pivoted towards communications and computing equipment, deemphasizing small arms manufacturing and repair.

After the Velvet Revolution of 1989, Zbrojovka began to downsize. The decline continued through the early 2000s, and, eventually, small arms production was discontinued. In August 2006, the last employee was made redundant. Shortly thereafter, Zbrojovka Brno liquidated its assets. Česká zbrojovka Uherský Brod acquired Zbrojovka's manufacturing equipment and intellectual property. Subsequently, it restarted rifle production on a smaller scale. Zbrojovka continues to manufacture hunting rifles as a subsidiary of Colt-CZ.

The premises previously occupied by Zbrojovka were auctioned off in 2008 for 707 million CZK (approximately 30 million USD) to J&T. As of 2023, the site is being developed by a real estate company that intends to build apartments and office buildings there.

== Products ==
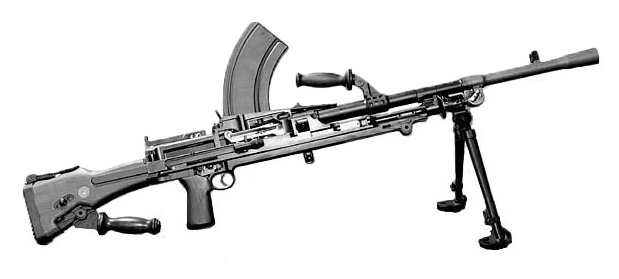
Bren light machine gun - a modification of ZB vz. 26

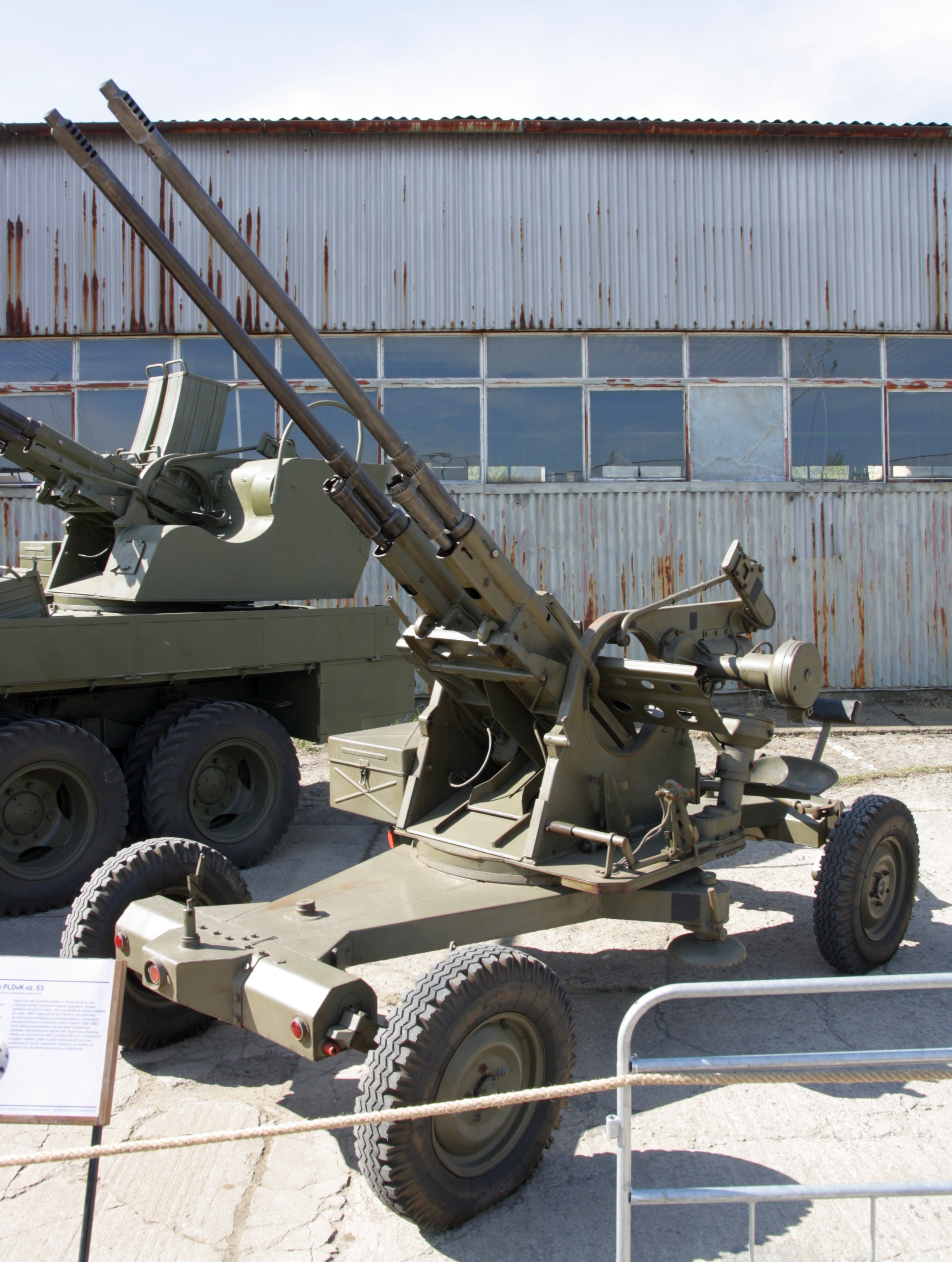
PLdvK vz. 53

=== Firearms ===
==== Discontinued ====
- vz. 98/22
- ZB vz. 26
- vz. 24
- ZH-29
- Karabiner 98k (German occupation of Czechoslovakia)
- Gewehr 33/40 (German occupation of Czechoslovakia)
- MG 34 (German occupation of Czechoslovakia)
- ZB-53
- ZB-60
- ZB-47 (a submachine gun with a 72 round magazine chambered in 9×19mm Parabellum, with a rotating feed system comparable to the FN P90, plus a 30-round collapsible-stock paratrooper variant)
- ZB-50
- ZB-530
- ZK-383
- PLdvK vz. 53/59

==== Current line-up ====
- BRNO COMBO - rifle, calibers .243 Win. .308 Win. or .30-06 Springfield
- BRNO STOPPER - double rifle, cal. 458 WinMag
- BRNO EFFECT - rifle, cal. 30-06

=== Motor vehicles ===
Zbrojovka built cars and light commercial vehicles with two-stroke engines. Their first model was the Disk, a two-door light car featuring a four-cylinder, 598cc, 10-horsepower (7.5 kW) engine. It launched in 1924.

It was succeeded in 1926 by the Z 18, a two-door sedan powered by a two-cylinder, 1005 cc engine producing 18 horsepower (13 kW). In 1929, the Z 9 was introduced. It had a 993cc engine producing 22 horsepower (16 kW). The body options for the Z 9 included a four-door sedan or convertible, a two-door, four-seat sedan, a two-seat convertible, and a commercial light truck.

In 1933, Zbrojovka introduced the Z 4, featuring a two-cylinder engine once again. Early versions had 905 cc (55.2 cu in) displacement with 19 horsepower (14 kW). In 1934, Zbrojovka introduced a 980 cc (60 cu in) variant that produced 25 horsepower (19 kW) in its base configuration and 35 horsepower (26 kW) in the sports coupé version. The Z 4 was Zbrojovka's most successful model in terms of production volume.

In 1935, Zbrojovka broadened its model lineup and introduced the Z 6 Hurvínek and Z 5 Express. The Z 6 had a two-cylinder engine 735 cc (44.9 cu in) displacement and 19 horsepower (14 kW). The Z 5 engine was modular with the Z 6: a four-cylinder version with 1,470 cc (90 cu in) displacement and 40 horsepower (30 kW). Zbrojovka designed a new body style for the Z 5 and Z 6 and updated the Z 4 similarly.

Next to their consumer vehicles, Zbrojovka also produced the Zbrojovka Z 6V from 1927 to 1929. This was a race car and the first Czechoslovak vehicle equipped with a supercharger. Zbrojovka ceased the production of the Z4 and Z5 in 1936, and the Z6 in 1937, to focus on armaments due to the deteriorating geopolitical situation. After World War II, the company pivoted to tractors and did not resume passenger car production.

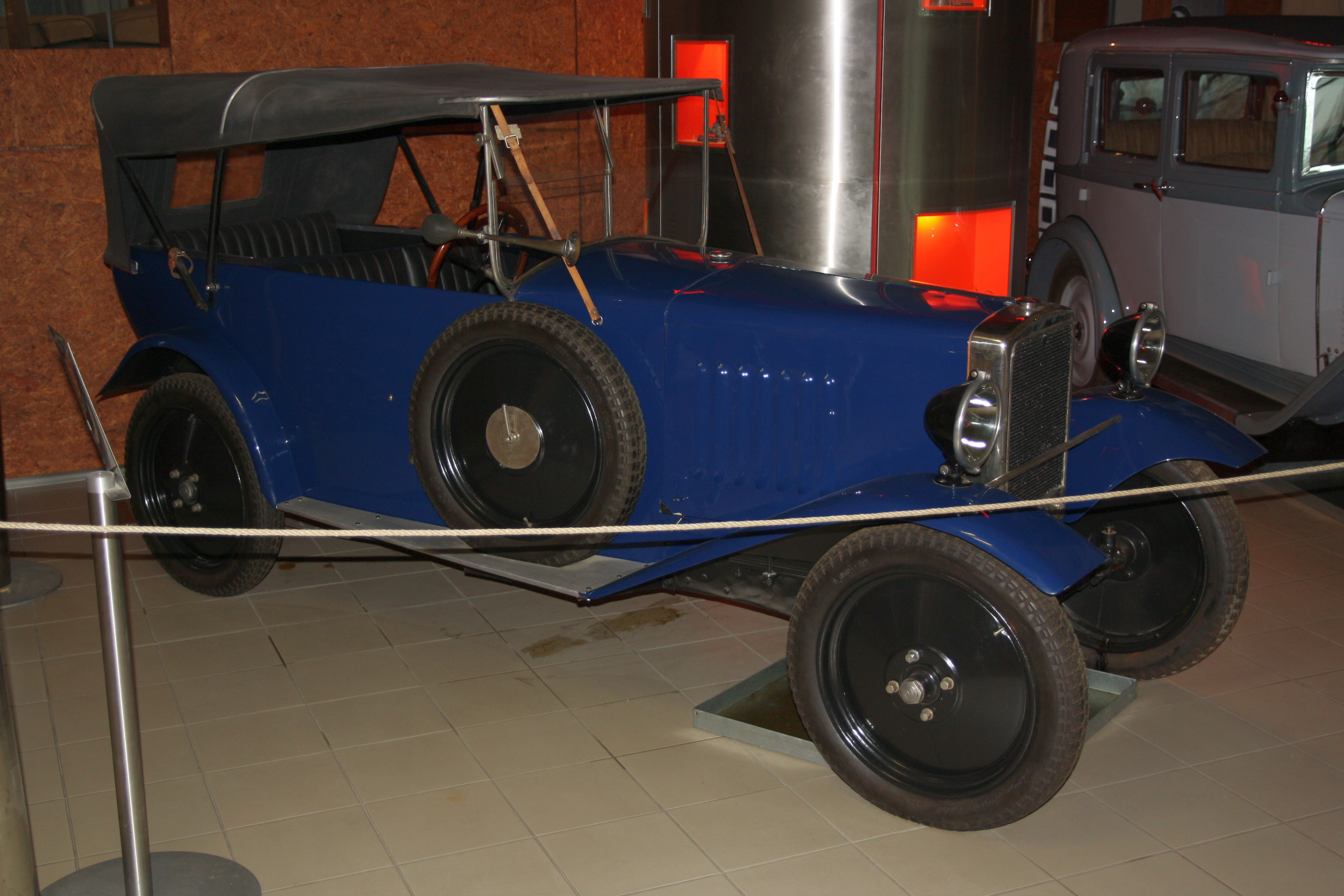
1925 Disk

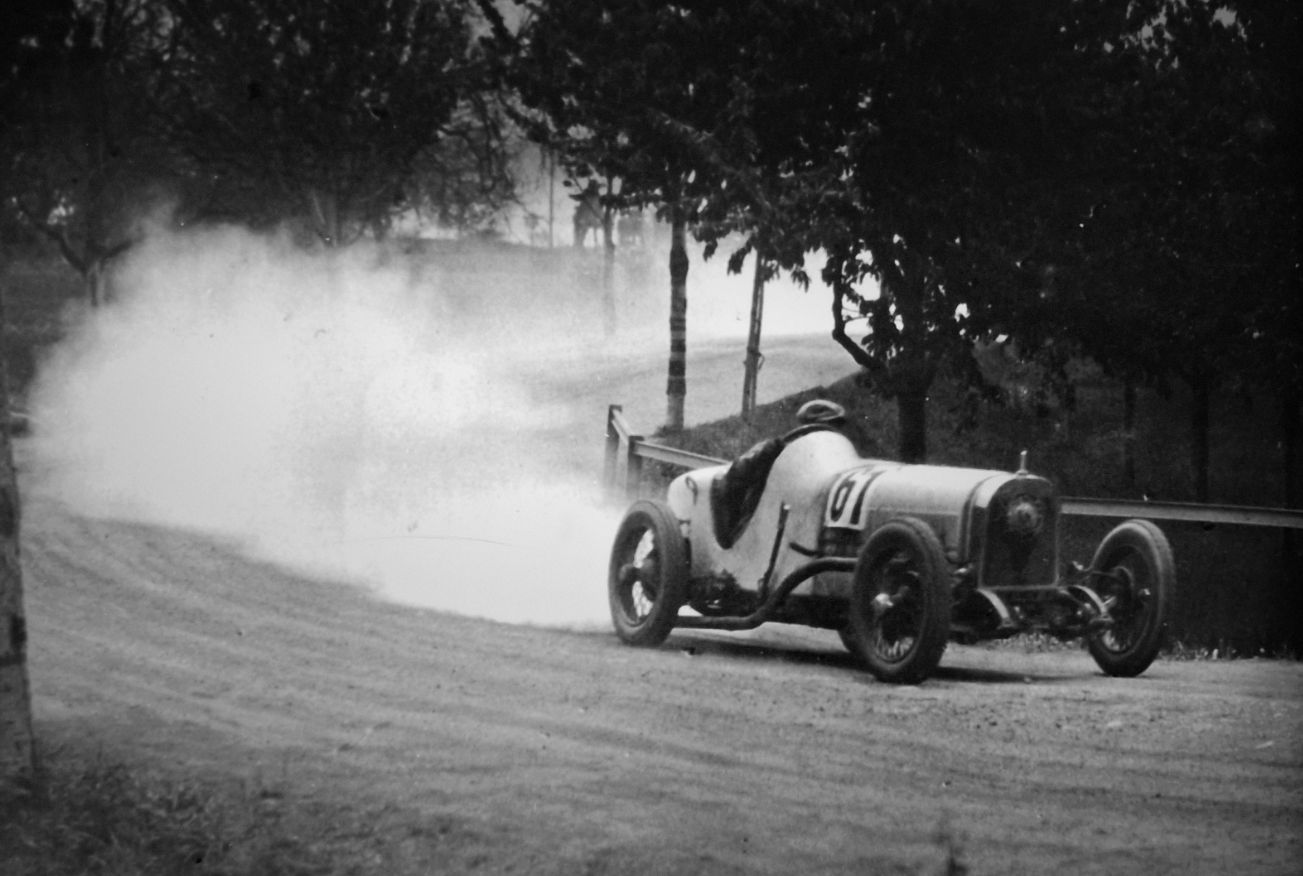
1928 Z 6V race car

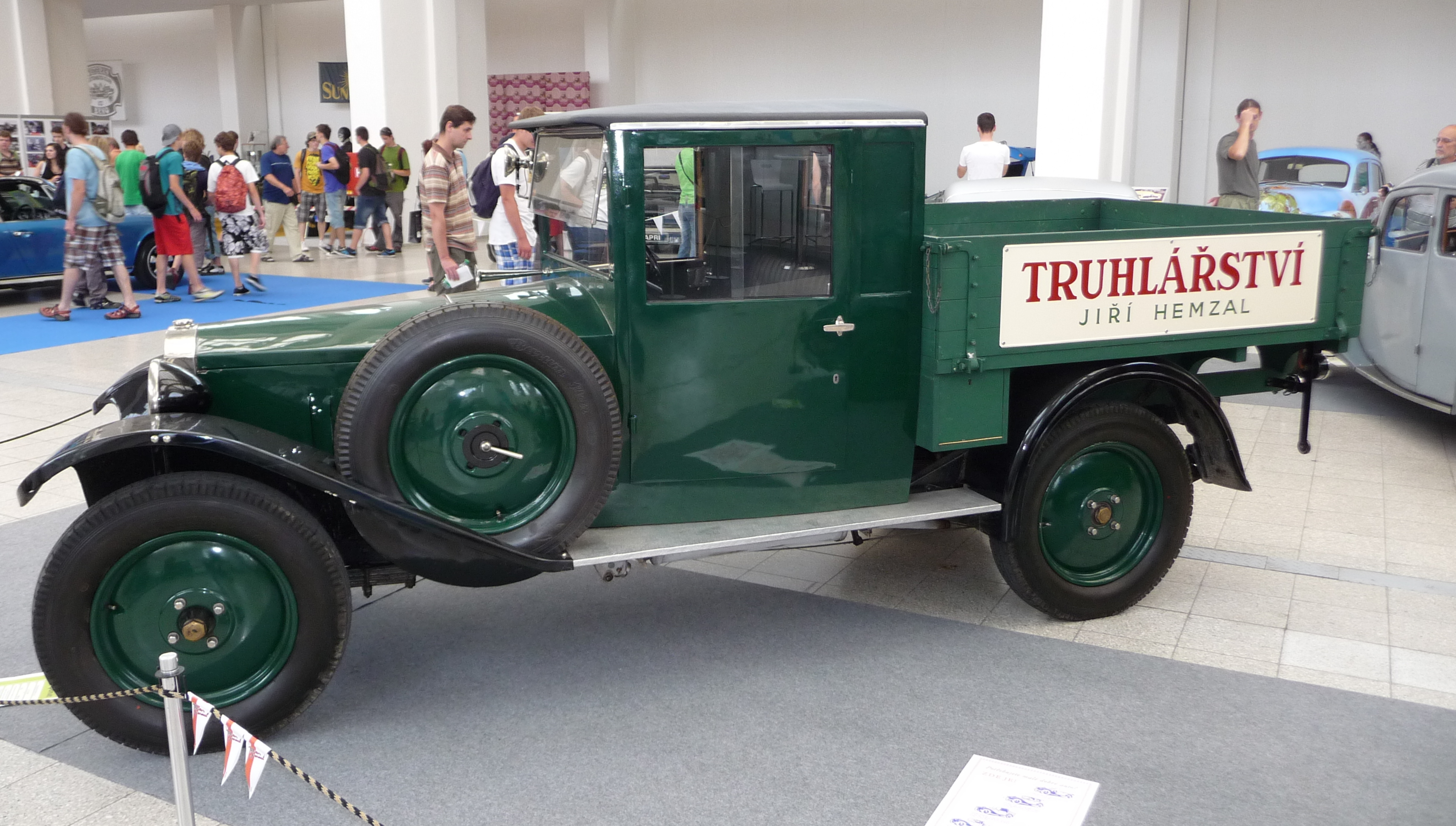
1929 Z 18 pick-up

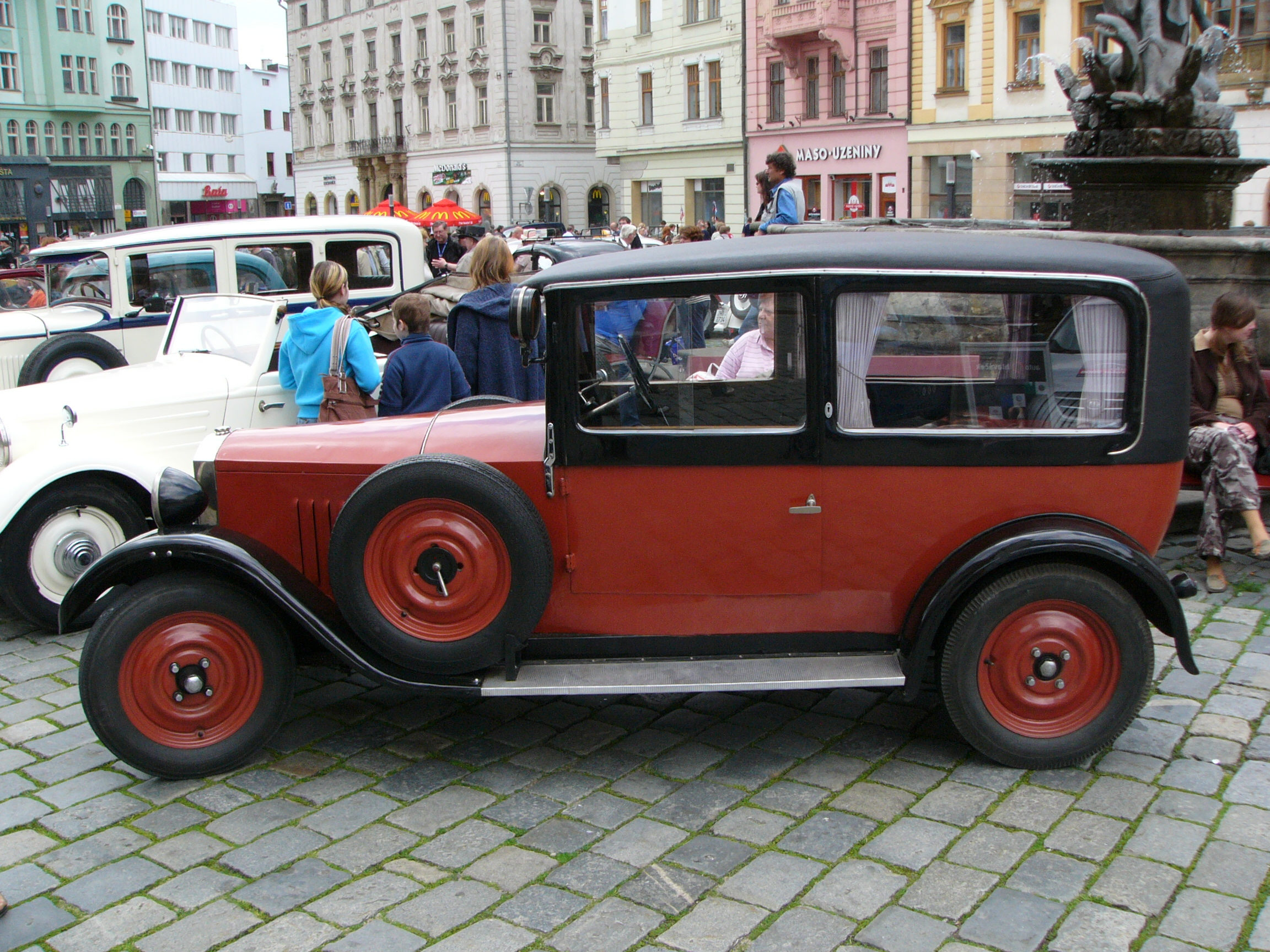
1929 Z 18

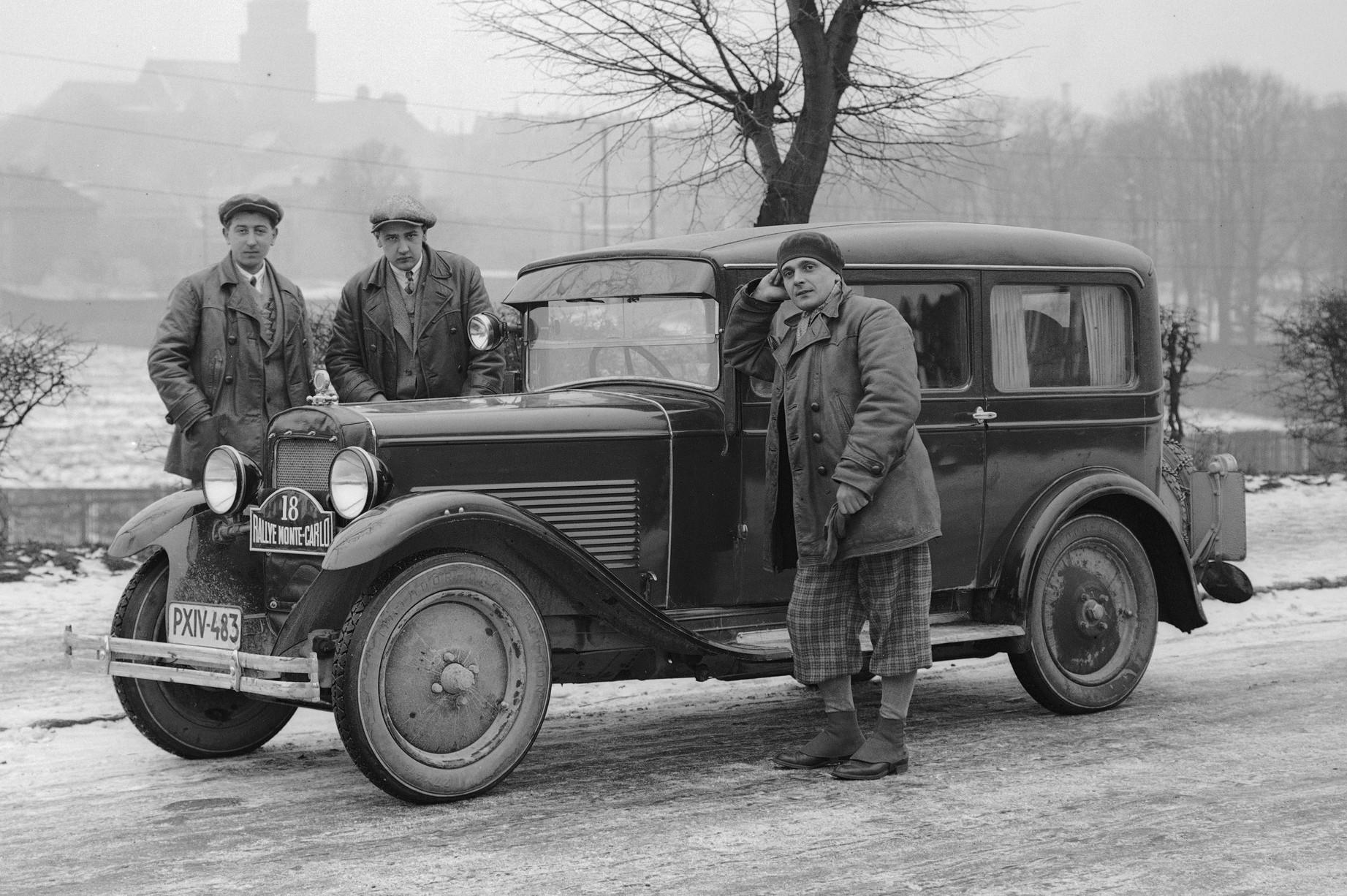
1931 Z 9

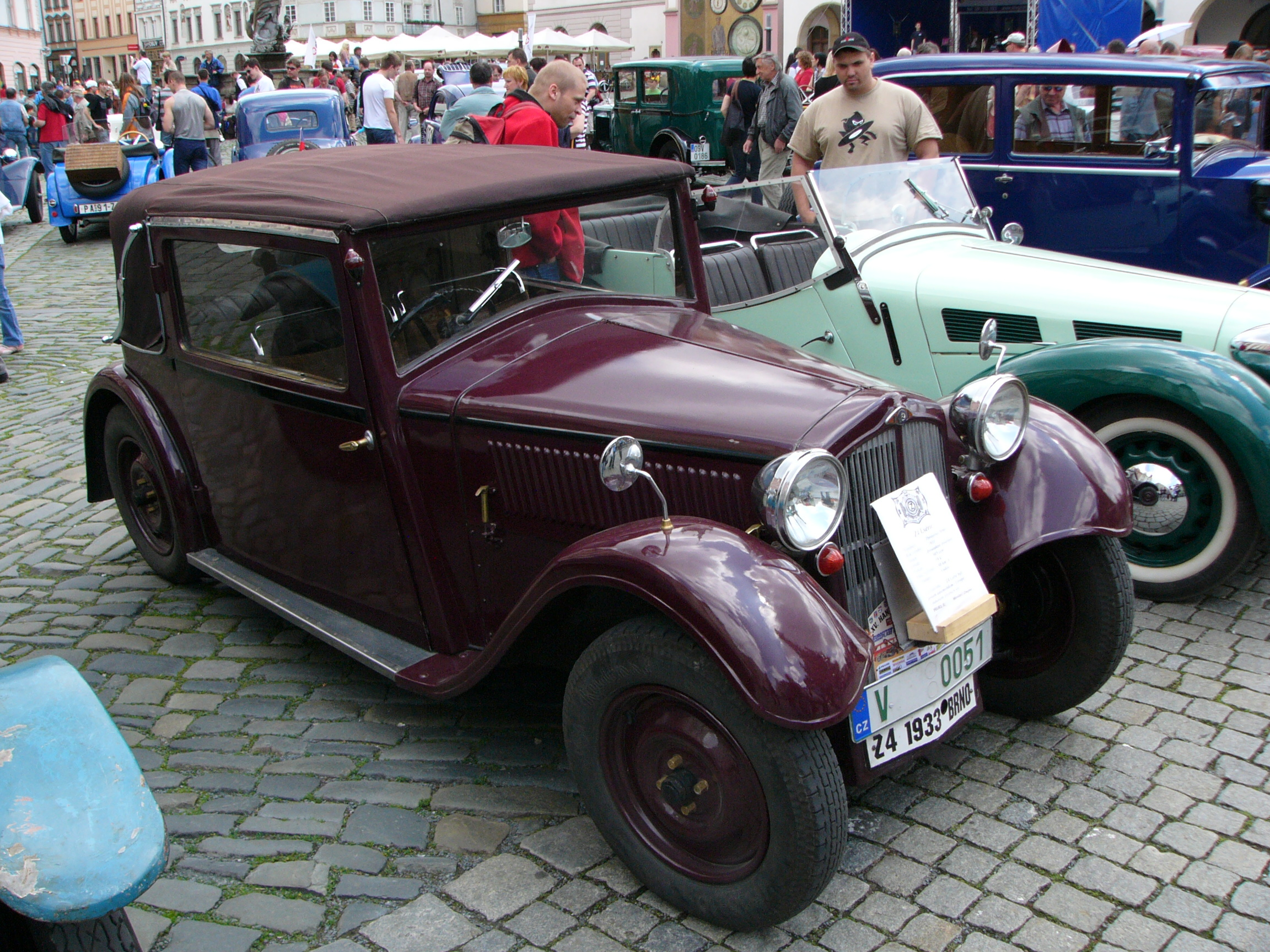
1933 Z 4 I

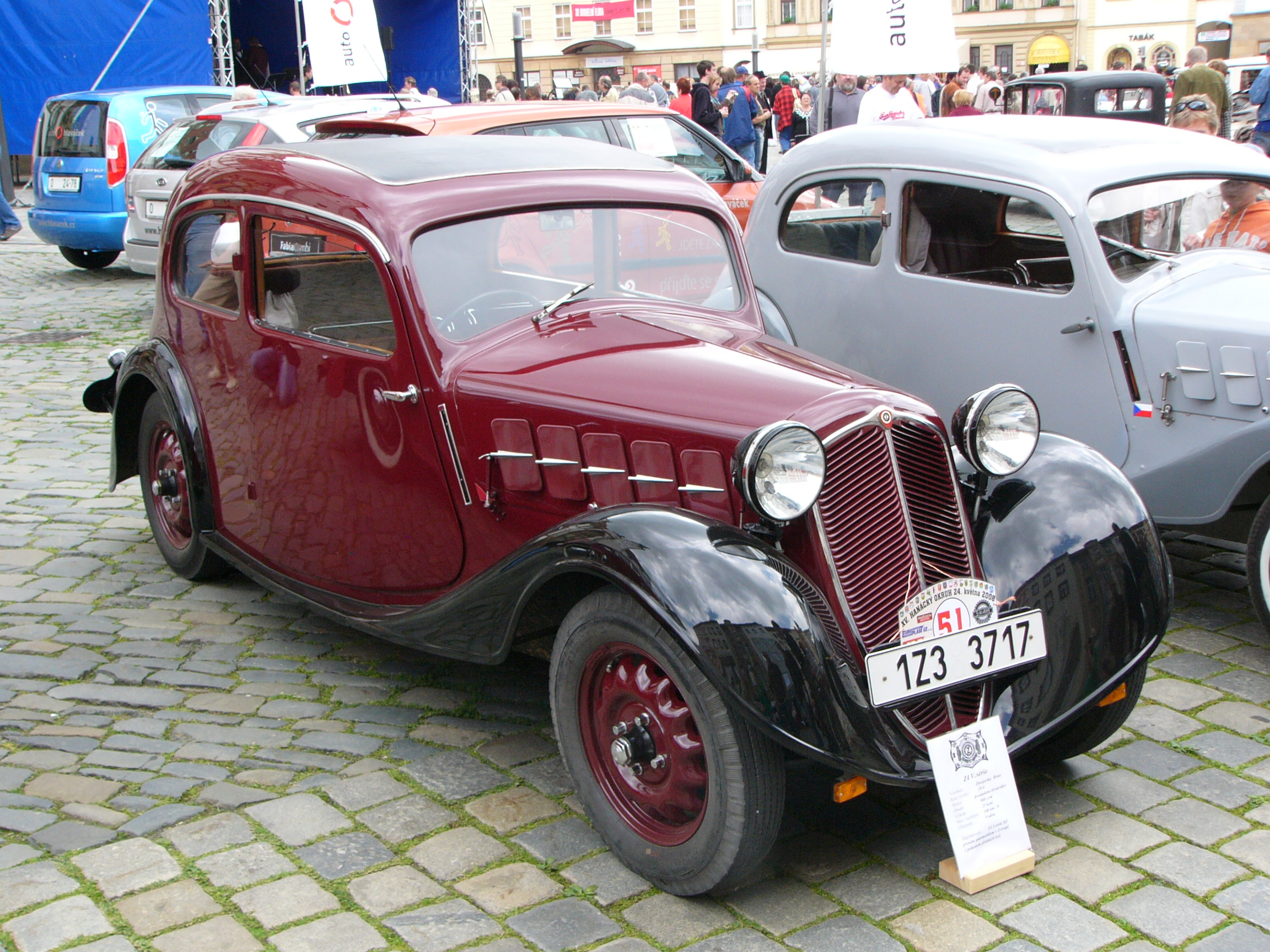
1936 Z 4 V

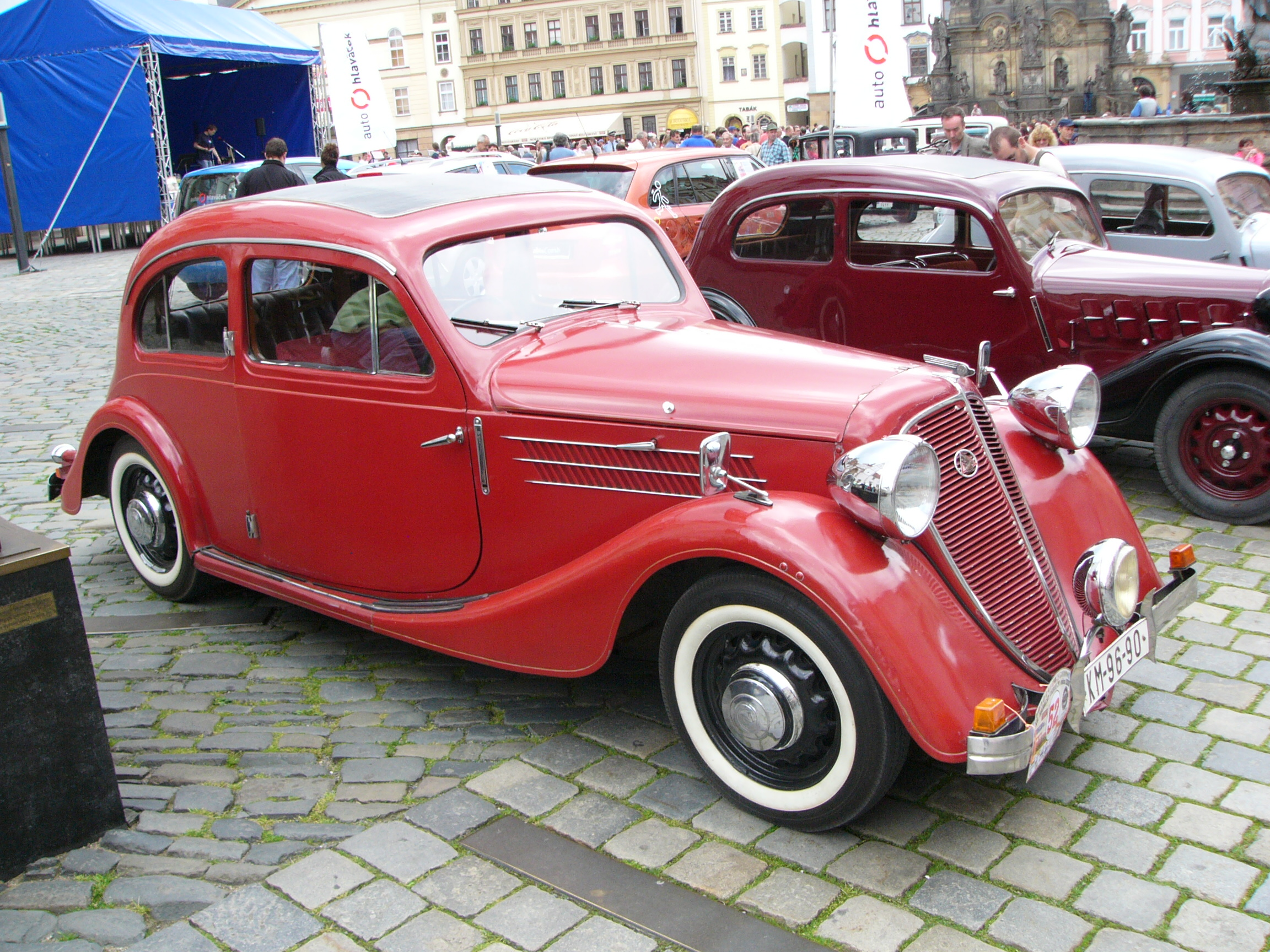
1936 Z 5 Express

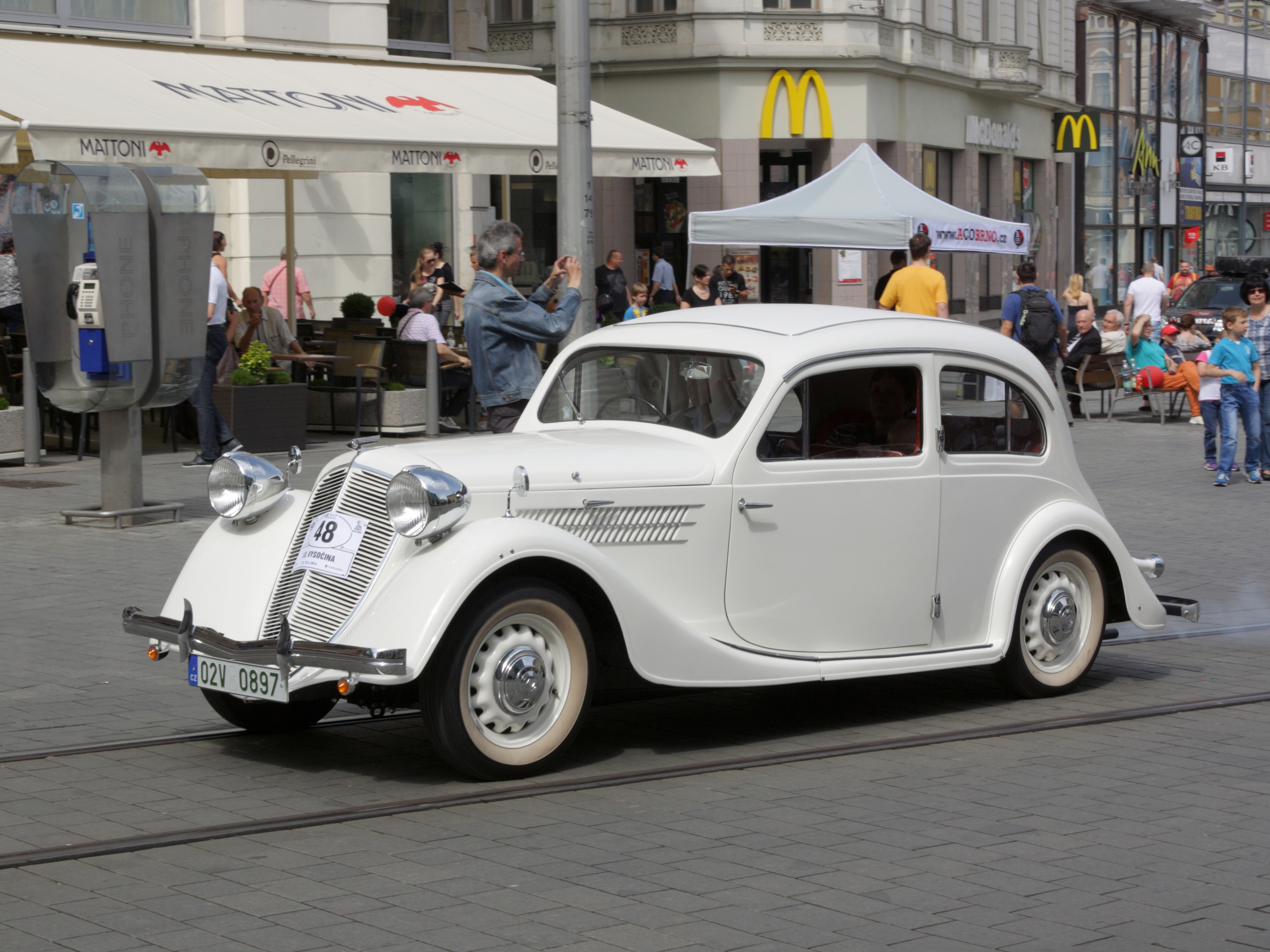
Z 5 Express

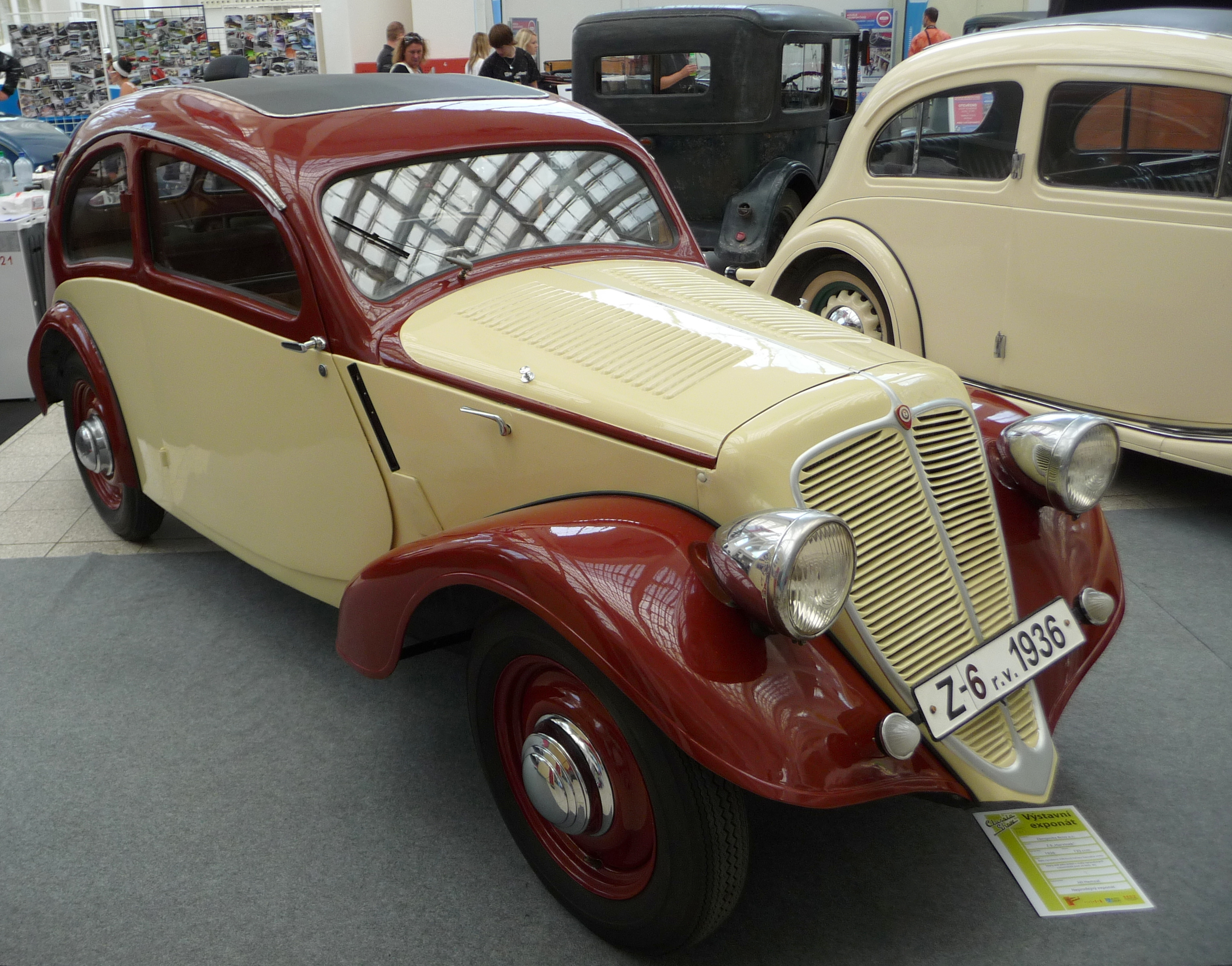
1936 Z 6 Hurvínek

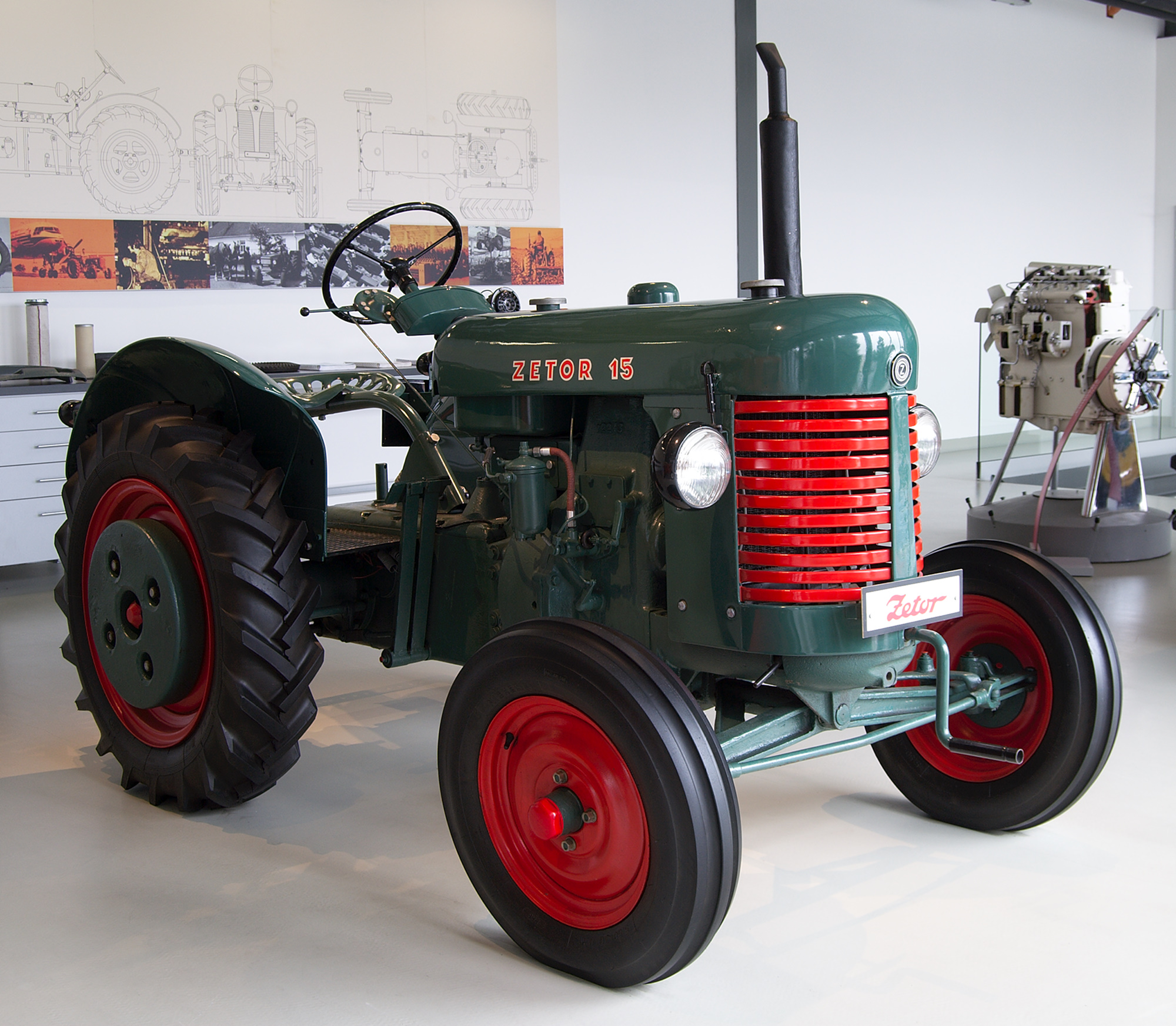
Zetor 15 tractor

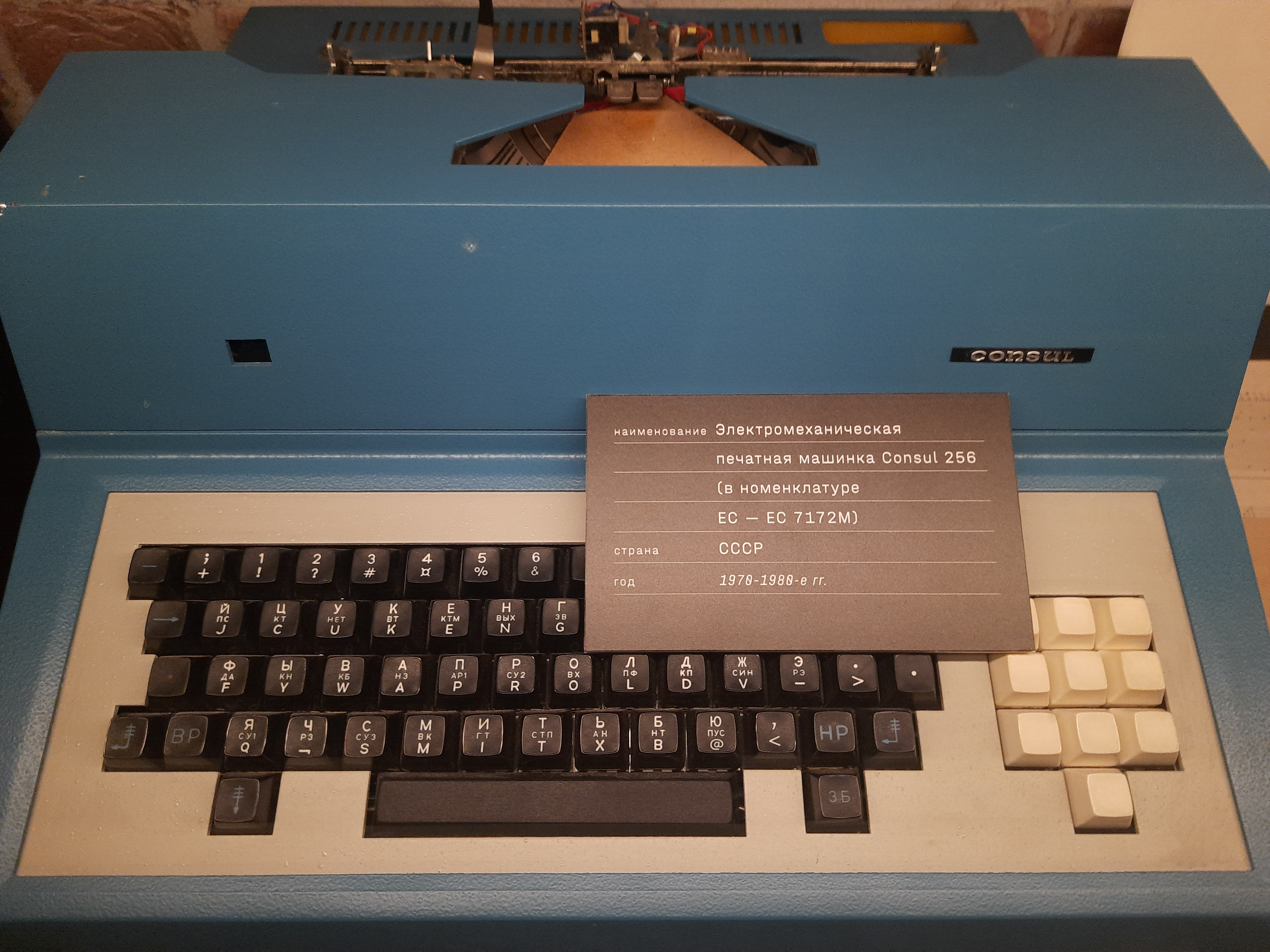
Consul 256 teleprinter

=== Typewriters ===
Zbrojovka began manufacturing typewriters under a license from Remington in 1931. They started using their own brand name, Consul, in 1953. One of the importers of Consul typewriters was Jack Tramiel, who initially incorporated Commodore Portable Typewriter, Ltd. in Toronto to resell typewriters built in Czechoslovakia. Commodore later pivoted to computers, much like Zbrojovka itself. Typewriter production at Zbrojovka eventually ceased in 1998.

=== Computers ===
During the 1980s, Zbrojovka manufactured 8-bit computers and computer peripherals under the brand name Consul.

== Bibliography ==
- Tuček, Jan (2017). Auta první republiky 1918–1938 (in Czech). Prague: Grada Publishing. ISBN 978-80-271-0466-6.
