= Zbrojovka Z 9 =

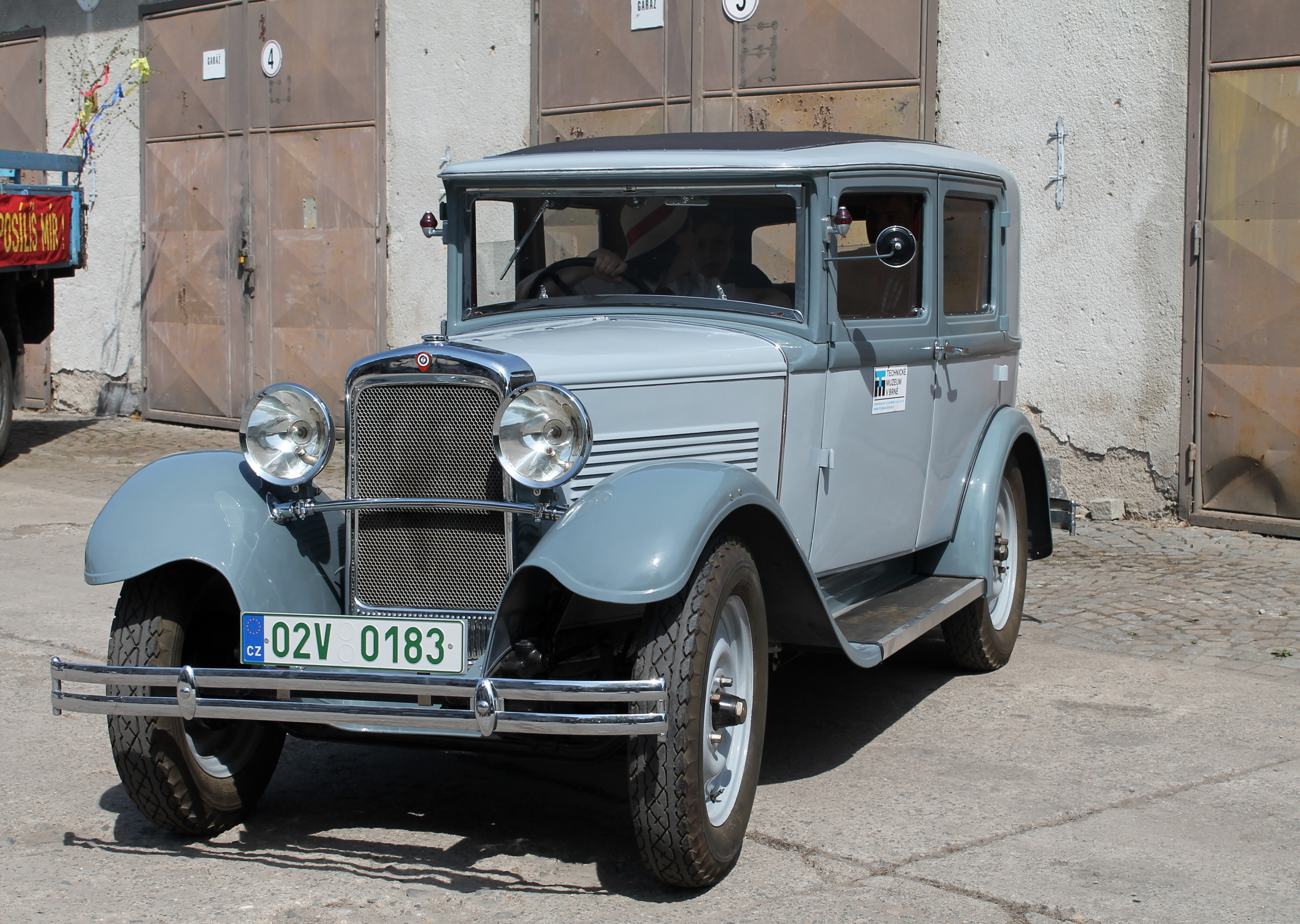
- Zbrojovka Z 9 at the Technical Museum in Brno, Czech Republic, in 2015

Overview
- Manufacturer: Československá Zbrojovka
- Production: October 1930 - June 1932
- Assembly: Czechoslovakia: Brno

Body and chassis
- Class: Mid-size
- Body style: 4-door phaeton; 2-door sedan; 2-door roadster
- Layout: Front-engine, rear-wheel drive

Powertrain
- Engine: 16 kW (21 hp) 993 cc (60.6 in^{3}) I4
- Transmission: 3 speed manual

Dimensions
- Wheelbase: 2,650 mm (104.3 in)
- Length: 3,950 mm (155.5 in)
- Width: 1,460 mm (57.5 in)
- Height: 1,450 mm (57.1 in) (phaeton); 1,655 mm (65.2 in) (sedan)
- Curb weight: 1,050 kg (2,314.9 lb)

Chronology
- Predecessor: Zbrojovka Z 18

The Zbrojovka Z 9 is a car produced by Československá Zbrojovka in the 1930s. First shown in 1929, the car had a conventional design, with a liquid-cooled two cylinder two stroke mounted at the front driving the rear wheels. In addition to a four door open top phaeton body, the car was also produced as a two-door to order, as both a roadster and a sedan, and a doorless pickup. In 1931, one car was raced 10,255 km (6,372 mi) across Europe, while another participated in the Monte Carlo Rally, although it did not finish. Production ran until 1932, with a total of 850 produced.

== Design ==
At the Prague Motor Show October 1929, Zbrojovka showed a slightly larger car than the Z 18 designed for a more upmarket customer. The car was put into production in 1930 as the Z 9 to replace the earlier vehicle. The Z 9 was of a conventional front-engine, rear-wheel drive layout, with drum brakes on all wheels, rigid axles, a three speed manual gearbox and a Gleason rear differential. Power was provided by a front-mounted, liquid-cooled, two cylinder two stroke 993 cc (60.6 in^{3}) engine with a bore of 79.5 mm (3 in) and stroke of 100 mm (4 in). The car was equipped with a 33-litre (7.3-imperial-gallon; 8.7-US-gallon) fuel tank, ran on a fuel to oil ration of 33:1 and had a 12V electric starter.

The basic body style was a four door open top phaeton which was available in black and cost 42,000 Kčs. The phaeton was 3,950 mm (155.5 in) long with a wheelbase of 2,650 mm (104.3 in). It was 1,460 mm (57.5 in) wide and 1,450 mm (57.1 in) high. Curb weight was 1,050 kg (2,314.9 lb). The Z 9 was also available as a two door roadster by order and a two door Tudor sedan, which was 1,655 mm (65.2 in) high and available in dark blue and dark green. Other vehicles were fitted with bodies produced by third parties, including two door cabriolet and semi-cabriolet designs created by Fischer of Brno and Brožík of Plzeň, and a four door cabriolet produced by Sodomka. In addition to the various passenger car models, the Z 9 was produced as a doorless pickup.

== Performance ==
The Z 9 could reach a top speed of 80 km/h (50 mph) and had a typical fuel consumption of between 10 and 11 L/100 km (28 and 26 mpg_{‑imp}; 24 and 21 mpg_{‑US}).

The car saw moderate success as a racing machine. Antonin Kahle and Rudolf Müttermüller completed a European cross-country race that started from Berlin in May 1931 and covered 10,255 kilometres (6,372 miles) in ten countries from Portugal to Yugoslavia in a Z 9, finishing in June. The Kroup brothers were unsuccessful in their bid to win the 1931 Monte Carlo Rally, retiring after losing their way in fog near Lyon.

== Production ==
The car was produced between October 1930 and June 1932, with a total of 850 vehicles manufactured of all body styles.
