= Zbrojovka Z 4 =

Car made by Zbrojovka Brno

Z 4
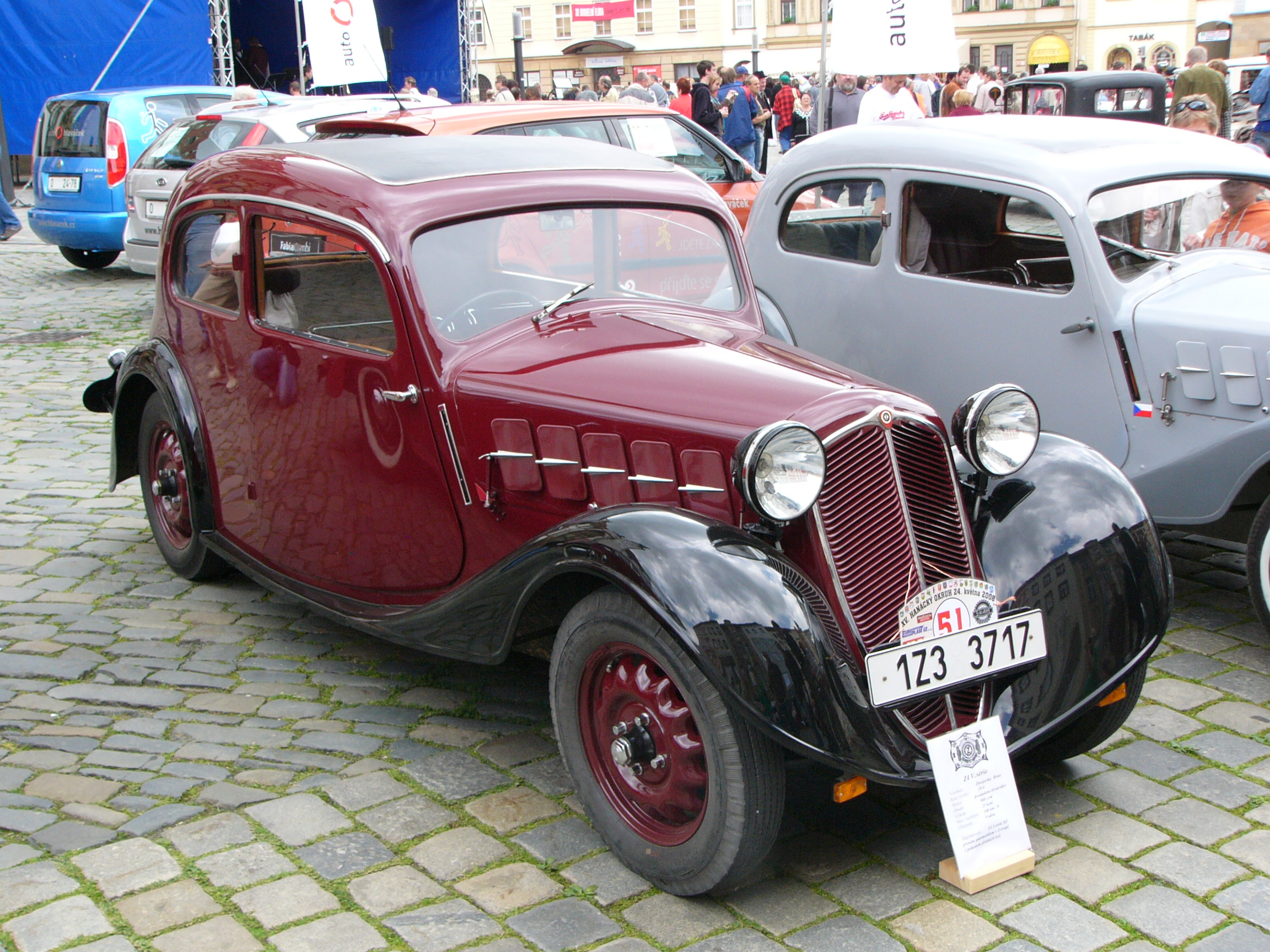

Overview
- Manufacturer: Zbrojovka Brno
- Production: 1933–1936
- Designer: Bořivoj Odstrčil

Body and chassis
- Layout: Front-wheel-drive
- Doors: 2

Powertrain
- Engine: in-line two-stroke, petrol
- Transmission: 3-speed manual

Dimensions
- Kerb weight: 750–830 kg (1,653–1,830 lb)

The Zbrojovka Z 4, nicknamed the "Strong Four", is a small passenger car that was produced from 1933 to 1936 by the company Zbrojovka Brno. After the company's earlier Z 9 did not meet expectations, Zbrojovka Brno wanted to license a design from German manufacturer DKW so they could start producing a front-wheel drive car, but that idea was dropped due to the high licensing fees that would have been required. Zbrojovka instead chose to develop a similar car but without DKW's patented designs. A prototype Z 4 was designed in the space of seven months by a team under the leadership of new chief designer Bořivoj Odstrčil. The Z 4 is the first Czechoslovak mass-produced car with front-wheel drive. A total of 2,750 cars were produced in five series. (Note: The production of vehicles at this time was not continuous, but took place series by series. A production plan was drawn up for each series based on the materials available and the work schedule. The production series at Czech car manufacturers numbered tens to hundreds of vehicles, and vehicles of different series usually differed in design to some extent.) Five racing Z 4s were produced in 1934. Of those five, three were entered in the Czechoslovak 1,000-mile race and won the President's Award for the best factory team.

== Background ==
In the early 1930s, Zbrojovka Brno produced the Z 9, a car whose sales results did not meet expectations. Zbrojovka Brno wanted a car with front-wheel drive, based on a licence for design from the German car manufacturer DKW. Zbrojovka Brno dispatched two workers to Zschoppau, Germany, to visit DKW for the possibility of buying the licence for the new car; but due to its high price, the political conditions at the time, and the non-beneficial contract, the licence was not purchased. Zbrojovka Brno decided to develop a car on the same concept, but without using DKW's patented solutions. A team of designers, under the leadership of new chief designer Bořivoj Odstrčil and engineer Antonín Voženílek, developed a prototype within seven months, by January 1933. The car, with the advertising nickname "Strong Four", debuted in April 1933 at the Prague Motor Show.

== Production and discontinuation ==
The new car was a success; the first series of 500 cars were sold out before the Z 4 production began in May 1933. It became the first Czech mass-produced car with front-wheel drive. Between 1933 and 1936, four more production series followed. Production was terminated by a decision of the Ministry of Defence (MNO) on 15 October 1936; the last cars were sold in 1937. A total of 2,750 units were produced in five production series, making the Z 4 the most successful car of the brand.

=== In racing ===
In 1934, a series of five racing Z 4s were created using a modified chassis, with an aerodynamic aluminium coupé body in a drop-influenced shape. The engine was tuned to an output of 26 KW (35 HP), and the cars reached a speed of 130 km/h (81 mph). Three of the cars participated in the second year of the Czechoslovak 1,000-mile race and won the President's Award for the best factory team. The Mamula-Mašek crew won the under-1.1-litres category at an average speed of 92 km/h (57 mph). In 2010, a recreation of the cars were built using the original documentation in which they were introduced.

== Series overview ==
- Series I – produced from April (May) to September 1933, a total of 500 units with Semi-Cabriolet (420 units) and Roadster (80 units) bodies.
- Series II – modification of the mask and body. Production from June 1933 to October 1936, a total of 750 units with Tudor and Semi-Cabriolet bodies.
- Series III – engine with increased displacement (980 cc) and power, body modification. Production from April to November 1934, a total of 500 units.
- Series IV – extending the wheelbase to 2700 mm, rack-and-pinion steering, rounding of the body. Production from August 1934 to October 1936, a total of 500 units.
- Series V – wheelbase extension to 2760 mm, rounding of the body. Production from April 1935 to October 1936, a total of 500 units.

== Design ==
=== Engine and transmission ===
The Z 4 is powered by an in-line, water-cooled, two-stroke petrol engine. The engine delivered 16 kW (21 hp) of power. The engine has a displacement of 908 cc (Series I and II) or 981 cc (Series III to V). The preparation of the fuel mixture is provided by the Zenith 30 carburetor. The engine is equipped with battery ignition, and the electrical installation works with a voltage of 6 V. The engine is cooled by thermosiphon, without a fan.

The engine is located behind the front axle. In front of the axle is a three-speed manual gearbox and a transfer case with a differential. The clutch is a single disc. The engine and gearbox form an assembly unit.

=== Chassis and body ===
The chassis is a rigid rectangular frame made of U profiles. The wheels are suspended on independent semi-axles formed by a transverse lower arm and connected by a transverse leaf spring. Steering is worm or rack (IV and V series). Mechanical drum brakes are on all four wheels. The wheels are steel discs and equipped with 4.50×18" or, later, 5.25×16" tires.

The cars were supplied with two-door Tudor, Semi-Cabriolet, or Roadster bodies. In addition to factory bodies, custom bodies were created by individual coach builders.

=== Technical data table ===
	Series I	Series II	Series III	Series IV	Series V
Kerb weight	750 kg	750 kg	800 kg	830 kg	830 kg
Wheelbase	2 600 mm	2 600 mm	2 600 mm	2 700 mm	2 760 mm
Axle track	1 100 mm	1 100 mm	1 100 mm	1 100 mm	1 100 mm
Engine displacement	905 cc		980 cc		
Fuel consumption	8–9 l /100 km				
Top speed	80–90 km/h		90–100 km/h		

== Literature ==
- Kuba, Adolf; Spremo, Milan (1989). Atlas našich automobilů 3: 1929–1936 (1 ed.). NADAS. ISBN 80-7030-049-3.
- "Eliška Junková Foundation: Silná čtyřka". Automobil revue. No. 4. Prague, Czech Republic: Unipress, Prague. 1993a. pp. 69–70. ISSN 1211-9555.
- "Eliška Junková Foundation: Hurvínek a Express". Automobil revue. No. 5. Prague, Czech Republic: Unipress, Praha. 1993b. pp. 69–70. ISSN 1211-9555.
- Kožíšek, Petr (2018). 1000 mil československých (1 ed.). National Technical Museum. ISBN 978-80-7037-308-8.
