= Zbrojovka Z 18 =

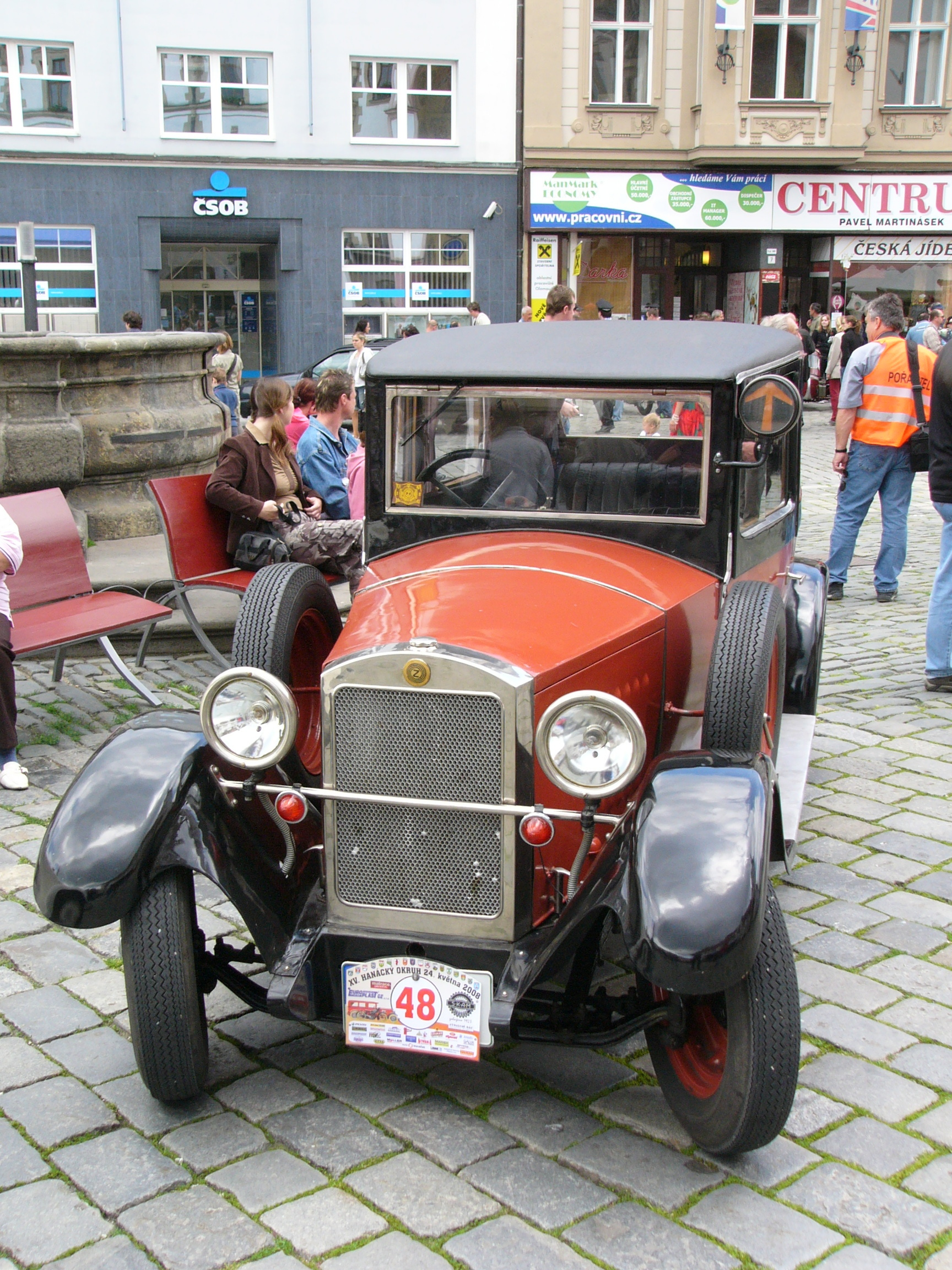
- 1929 Zbrojovka Z 18

Overview
- Manufacturer: Československá Zbrojovka
- Production: 1925–1930
- Model years: 1926–1930
- Assembly: Czechoslovakia: Brno
- Designer: František Mackrle

Body and chassis
- Class: Mid-size
- Body style: 1-, 2- and 4-door phaeton; 2-door limousine; 2-door roadster
- Layout: Front-engine, rear-wheel drive

Powertrain
- Engine: 13 kW (17 hp) 1,004 cc (61.3 in^{3}) I2
- Transmission: 3-speed manual

Dimensions
- Wheelbase: 2,650 mm (104.3 in)
- Length: 3,750 mm (147.6 in)
- Width: 1,380 mm (54.3 in)
- Height: 1,580 mm (62.2 in) (phaeton)
- Curb weight: 780 kg (1,719.6 lb) (phaeton)

The Zbrojovka Z 18 is a car produced by Československá Zbrojovka in the 1920s. Derived from the more powerful of two Z 26 designs developed following the Disk, the Z 18 was first produced in 1925. The car was produced in a variety of body types, including a four seat open-top phaeton fitted with one, two and four doors, limousine and landaulet and a two-door roadster. It had a two-stroke two-cylinder 1,004 cc (61.3 in^{3}) engine which enabled the car to reach a speed of 80 km/h (50 mph). A total of 2,510 vehicles were produced before production ceased in 1930.

== Background ==
After the failure of the Disk, Zbrojovka was determined that its next car design would be a success. The company had a new engineering team that included the talented František Mackrle and he designed two new designs, both named Z 26, with different engine sizes. The Board liked the more powerful version, but required the prototype to undergo rigorous testing, including driving over 9,200 kilometres (5,700 miles) across Europe, crossing the Dolomite and Alps and driving as far as Hamburg. The car passed the tests and entered production as the 4/18 or Z 18 in 1925.

== Design and development ==
The Z 18 had a rectangular frame with rigid axles. The water cooled, two-stroke two-cylinder engine drove the rear wheels through a three speed gearbox. It had a bore of 80 mm (3 1/6 in) and stroke 100 mm (4 in), capacity of 1,004 cc (61.3 in^{3}) and a Zenith carburettor. The standard car was fitted with 730 x 130 disc wheels, although more expensive versions had Rudge-Whitworth wire wheels. The basic body style was a four seat phaeton which cost 35,000 Kčs in 1926. It was open-top with a single door on the left, steering wheel on the right and a bench seat that was accessed by lowering the left front seat.

The range of body types available increased over the car's production life. In September 1926, a limousine version was launched at the Prague Motor Show at a price of 40,500 Kčs. This had a fixed roof with four side windows and more equipment, including an electric cigar lighter and coat hanger. A sports roadster was also available, priced at 45,000 Kčs. Gradually over time, two and four door phaetons, landaulets and other custom designs were added to the range. There was also a pickup truck capable of carrying a 500 kg (1,100 lb) payload.

The Z 18 could reach a top speed of 80 km/h (50 mph) and had a typical fuel consumption of between 10 and 11 L/100 km (28 and 26 mpg_{‑imp}; 24 and 21 mpg_{‑US}).

== Production ==
2,510 vehicles, including 1,000 commercial vehicles, were sold between 1926 and 1930.
