= Curragh Military Museum =

- Músaem Míleata an Churraigh

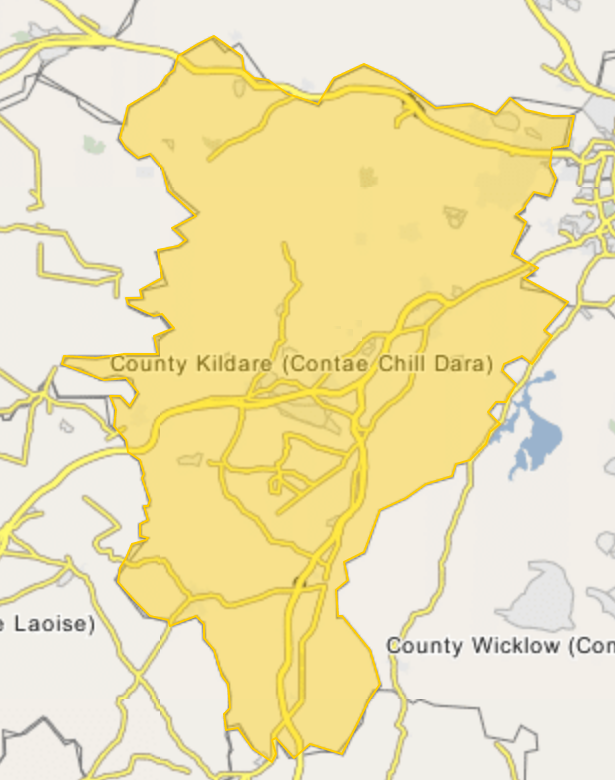
- Location within County Kildare Location within Ireland
- Established: 2010
- Location: Curragh Camp, County Kildare, Ireland
- Coordinates: 53°08′45″N 6°49′51″W
- Type: Military museum
- Curator: Lt Col Des Healy
- Owner: Irish Army
- Public transit access: Curragh (Bus Éireann route 126)
- Parking: Onsite
- Website: www.military.ie/en/public-information/defence-forces-museums/the-curragh-museum/

The Curragh Military Museum (Irish: Músaem Míleata an Churraigh) is a museum in Ireland dedicated to the military history of the Curragh Camp and of The Curragh.

== History ==
The Curragh Military Museum was founded in 2010. It was extensively refurbished during a period of closure in 2020–22 during the COVID pandemic.

== Contents ==
The museum is housed in a long rectangular building in the centre of Curragh Camp, in an area accessible to civilians. It is in three areas: archaeology, the English/British period (17th century to 1922), and the modern Irish Army use (1922–present).

A large collection of artillery pieces, armoured cars and tanks are displayed outside, including a Ordnance QF 2-pounder, a QF 3.7-inch mountain howitzer, a QF 4.5-inch howitzer, a Ordnance QF 6-pounder, a Ordnance QF 17-pounder, a Ordnance QF 25-pounder, two FV101 Scorpion (571-BZU and 439-VZJ), two different variants of Panhard AML (AML 90 and AML 20 (NZH-7)), a Comet tank, a Churchill tank, a Beaverette Mk IV armoured car (ZD-3402) and a Panhard M3 amphibious armoured personnel carrier.

Inside the museum is shown the Rolls-Royce armoured car named Sliabh na mBan (ARR2, YI-6450), which is reputed to be one of the world's oldest serving armoured vehicles; it is still used for ceremonial purposes. Also shown is a single replica Peerless armoured car (AP1), a QF 18-pounder gun, and other military weapons and artefacts.

Also in the museum collections are QF 3.7-inch AA gun and a Bofors 40 mm L/60 gun.

Alfred Chester Beatty donated a collection of weapons from around the world to the Irish Defence Forces in 1952; they are housed in Curragh Military Museum.
