= Standard Beaverette =

Standard Car 4x2
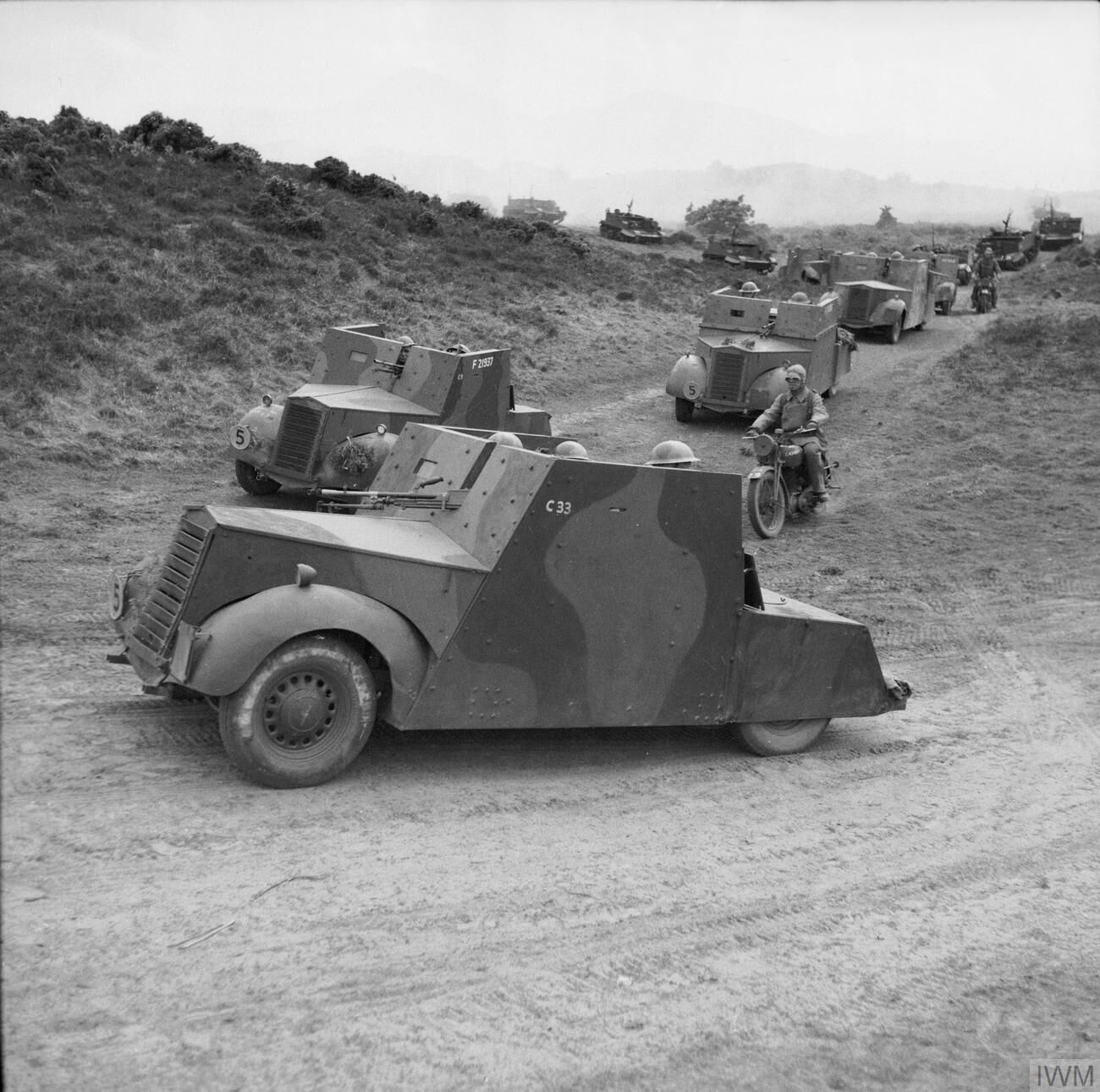
- Beaverettes of 53rd Reconnaissance Regiment on manoeuvres in Northern Ireland, 1941
- Type: Improvised Armoured Car
- Place of origin: United Kingdom

Production history
- Manufacturer: Standard Motor Company

Specifications
- Mass: Mk I: 2 tonnes (2.2 short tons; 2.0 long tons); Mk III: 2.6 tonnes (2.9 short tons; 2.6 long tons)
- Length: Mk I: 4.11 m (13 ft 6 in); Mk III: 3.10 m (10 ft 2 in)
- Width: Mk I: 1.60 m (5 ft 3 in); Mk III: 1.73 m (5 ft 8 in)
- Height: Mk I: 1.52 m (5 ft 0 in); Mk III: 2.16 m (7 ft 1 in)
- Crew: 3
- Armour: Mk III: up to 9 mm (0.35 in); Mk IV: up to 12 mm (0.47 in)
- Main armament: 0.303 (7.7 mm) Bren MG or twin Vickers machine gun
- Engine: Standard 4-cylinder petrol engine 46 hp (34 kW)
- Power/weight: 17-23 hp/tonne
- Suspension: 4x2 wheel, leaf spring
- Operational range: Mk III: 300 km (190 mi)
- Maximum speed: Mk III: 38 km/h (24 mph)

Standard Car 4x2, or Car Armoured Light Standard, better known as the Beaverette, was a British improvised armoured car produced during the Second World War.

== History ==
The first version of the vehicle was built in 1940 by Standard Motor Company at the instigation of Lord Beaverbrook, then Minister of Aircraft Production (hence the name Beaverette). It was based on commercial car chassis - the Standard Flying Fourteen saloon - on which a simple riveted armoured hull was mounted. The 11 mm (0.43 in) of steel was backed by 3 inch thick oak planks. The hull was open at the top and at the rear. The armament consisted of a Bren light machine gun, which could be fired through a slot in the casemate armour. Subsequent versions received all-around protection and a machine gun turret - an enclosed one with a Bren or an open-topped one with twin Vickers machine guns. Some vehicles also carried Boys anti-tank rifles. Some also had a No. 11 or No. 19 radio set. Production was stopped in 1942. About 2,800 units were delivered.

Describing the vehicle in 1941, a correspondent for The Light Car magazine reported "touching the 60-mark [60 mph (97 km/h)]" while following one along a road. Restricted vision meant the Beaverette driver had to rely on an observer to relay information about other road traffic and also to consider situations well in advance, for example, when making a turn, the driver had to base his steering on "observations made something like ten yards [30 ft (9.1 m)] back".

The Beaverette was extensively used by the Home Guard, British Army and RAF Regiment for home defence service and training. The vehicle is said to have suffered from excessive weight and to have been hard to handle.

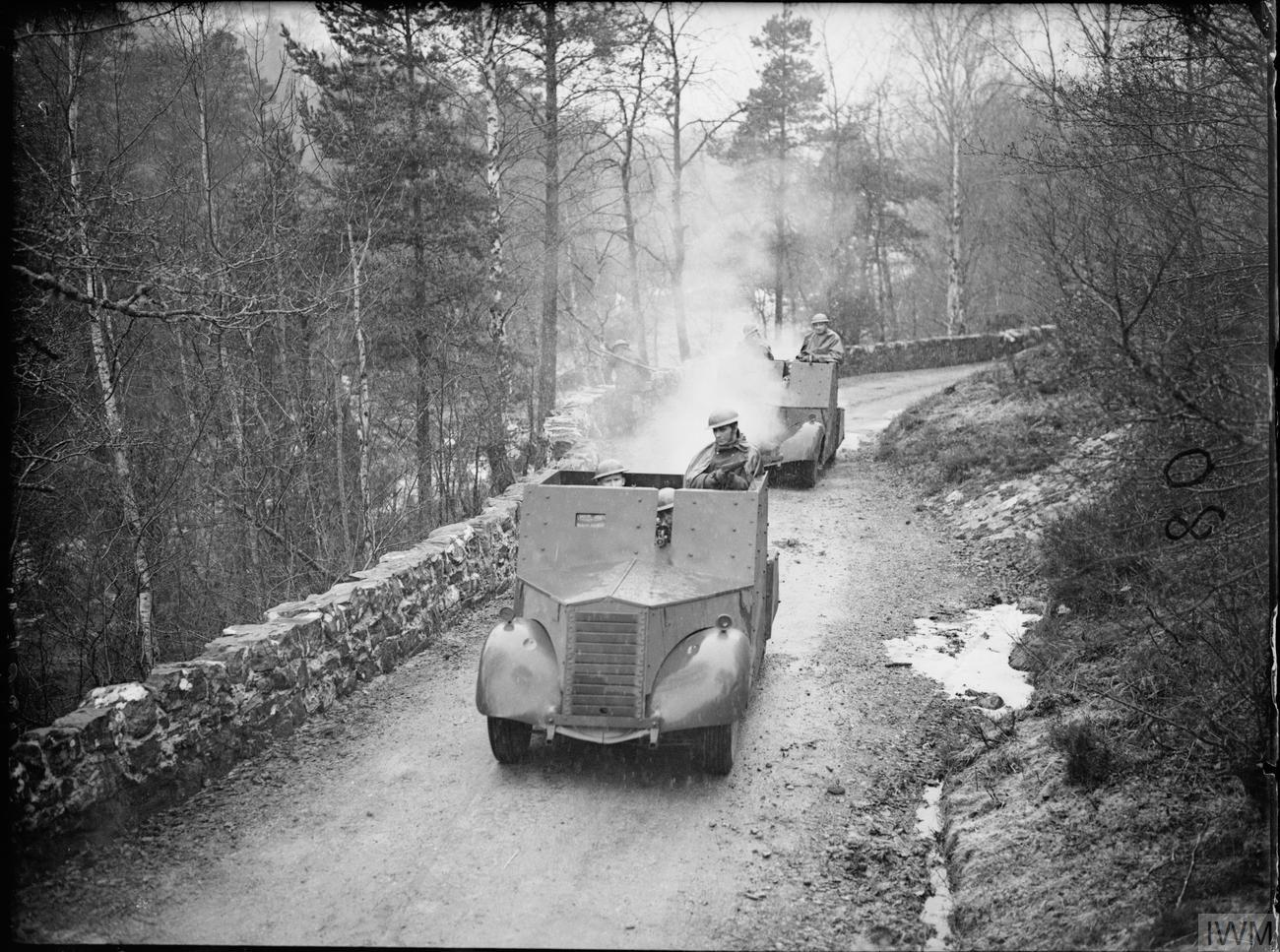
Beaverette Mk II light reconnaissance cars manned by members of the Home Guard in the Highlands of Scotland, 14 February 1941.

== Variants ==
- Mk I - original version.
- Mk II - had all-around armour and the radiator grill was moved from a vertical position to a horizontal one.
- Mk III Beaverbug - had a shortened chassis, a redesigned hull without curved front wings, top armour and a machine gun turret. A Mk III was used by the RAF Regiment in the capture of a Focke-Wulf Fw 190 and destruction of another when they landed at RAF West Malling in April 1943.
- Mk IV - glacis armour was redesigned to improve visibility.
- A similar vehicle, known as Beaverette (NZ), was produced in New Zealand Railways Department Hutt Workshops. The car used a Ford 3/4 or 1-ton truck chassis and plate salvaged from the merchant ships Port Bowen and Mokoia for armour. They had a crew of four; 208 units were built.

== Survivors ==
- A Mark III Beaverette is displayed at the Imperial War Museum Duxford.
- In 2018, the Tank Museum acquired a Mark III for restoration
- A Mark III is in the Cobbaton Combat Collection, a private collection of military vehicles in Umberleigh, Devon in the United Kingdom
- A Mark IV Beaverette is displayed at the Museum Bevrijding Vleugels in the Netherlands.
- A Mark IV Beaverette, later used by the Irish Army, is preserved at Curragh Military Museum in Ireland.
- MM Park museum in La Wantzenau in France also has a Mk IV on display.
