= List of World War II weapons used in Ireland =

This is a list of World War II weapons of Ireland. Throughout World War II, Ireland held a policy of neutrality. Ireland prepared for invasions from both Britain and Nazi Germany. Some cooperation with the Allies did occur such as Plan W as well as allowing allied aircraft over Irish airspace through the Donegal Corridor and providing access to weather reports from the Atlantic Ocean which were used to help decide when D-day would occur. The IRA allied itself with Nazi Germany in pursuit of Irish republicanism as seen from Operation Dove. However they were not part of the Irish army and were not supported by the Irish government and so will be left out of this list. Of note is that Ireland received many British WWI weapons due to conflicts with the United Kingdom just after WWI such as the Irish War of Independence and Irish Civil War when a lot of these weapons would have been captured by Irish forces in the fighting.

== Small arms ==
=== Rifles ===
- Short magazine Lee–Enfield No. 1 MKIII – standard issue
- Springfield M1903 – Local Defence Force and Local Security Force
- M1917 Enfield – Local Defence Force

=== Sidearms ===
- Enfield No. 2
- Webley MK IV revolver – standard issue
- Mauser C96 – 295 in Army stockpiles

=== Machine guns ===
- Vickers machine gun
- Lewis gun
- Bren gun
- Madsen machine gun – vehicle use
- Hotchkiss M1909 – vehicle use
- Vickers .50 machine gun – vehicle use

=== Grenade ===
- Mills bomb
- MK3 rifle grenade
- Molotov Cocktail/Petrol Bomb (made and used during exercises)

=== Submachine guns ===
- M1921 Thompson – Army stockpiles left over from the revolutionary period
- Bergmann MP-18 – Army stockpiles put into commission

=== Sniper rifles ===
- Pattern 1914 (scoped variant)

=== Shotguns ===
- Winchester 1897
- 12 bore shotgun

=== Melee weapons ===
- Pattern 1907 bayonet
- Irish Army officers sabre

== Anti-tank weapons ==
- Boys anti-tank rifle
- Ordnance QF 2-pounder anti-tank gun
- 25 lb anti-tank mine (Irish made)
- "De Valera" mine (Irish made)

== Artillery ==
=== Mortars ===
- Brandt Mle 27/31
- ML 3-inch
- Brandt Mle 1935

=== Field artillery ===
- QF 18-pounder gun
- BL 60-pounder gun
- QF 4.5-inch howitzer

== Anti-aircraft guns ==
- Bofors 40 mm
- QF 3-inch 20 cwt
- QF 3.7-Inch
- QF 12-pounder 12 cwt naval gun (modified for anti-aircraft purposes)

== Coastal defence guns ==
- BL 9.2-inch
- BL 6-inch
- QF 12-pounder 12 cwt
- QF 4.7-inch

== Armoured fighting vehicles (AFVs) ==
=== Armoured cars ===
- Rolls-Royce armoured car
- Landsverk L180
- Leyland armoured car
- Beaverette
- Universal 'Bren' Carrier
- Ford MK V
- Ford MK VI
- Ford MK IV
- Dodge MK VII
- Dodge MK VIII
- GSR Morris MK IV

=== Tanks ===
- Landsverk L-60
- Vickers MK. D

== AFV armaments (not including small arms used as armaments) ==
- Madsen 20 mm
- QF 6-pounder

== Marine Service vessels ==
- Muirchú
- PAS Fort Rannoch
- MTB-1
- MTB-2
- MTB-3
- MTB-4
- MTB-5
- MTB-6
- Various port control pilot boats

== Other vehicles ==
- Morris Commercial C8 FAT
- BSA M20 500cc Motorbike
- Morris Commercial CDSW
- Leyland Retriever Machinery Lorry

== See also ==
- List of aircraft of Ireland in World War II
