= Armoured fighting vehicles of the Irish Army =

Irish Rolls-Royce Armoured Car, in County Cork, 1941

Throughout its history, the Irish Army has used a number of armoured fighting vehicles.

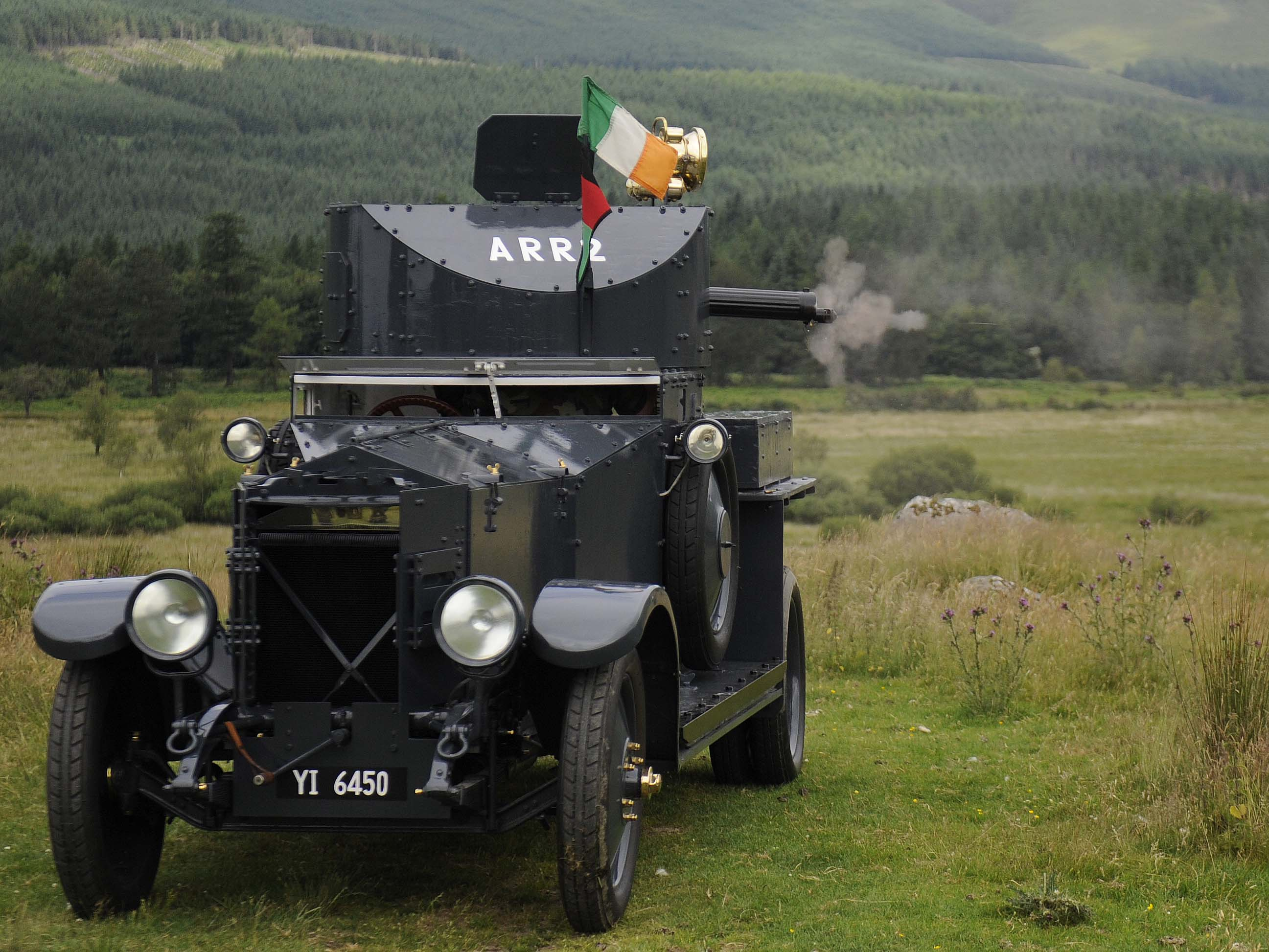
Restored Rolls-Royce armoured car Sliabh na mBan (ARR2) in 2013

== Rolls-Royce armoured car ==
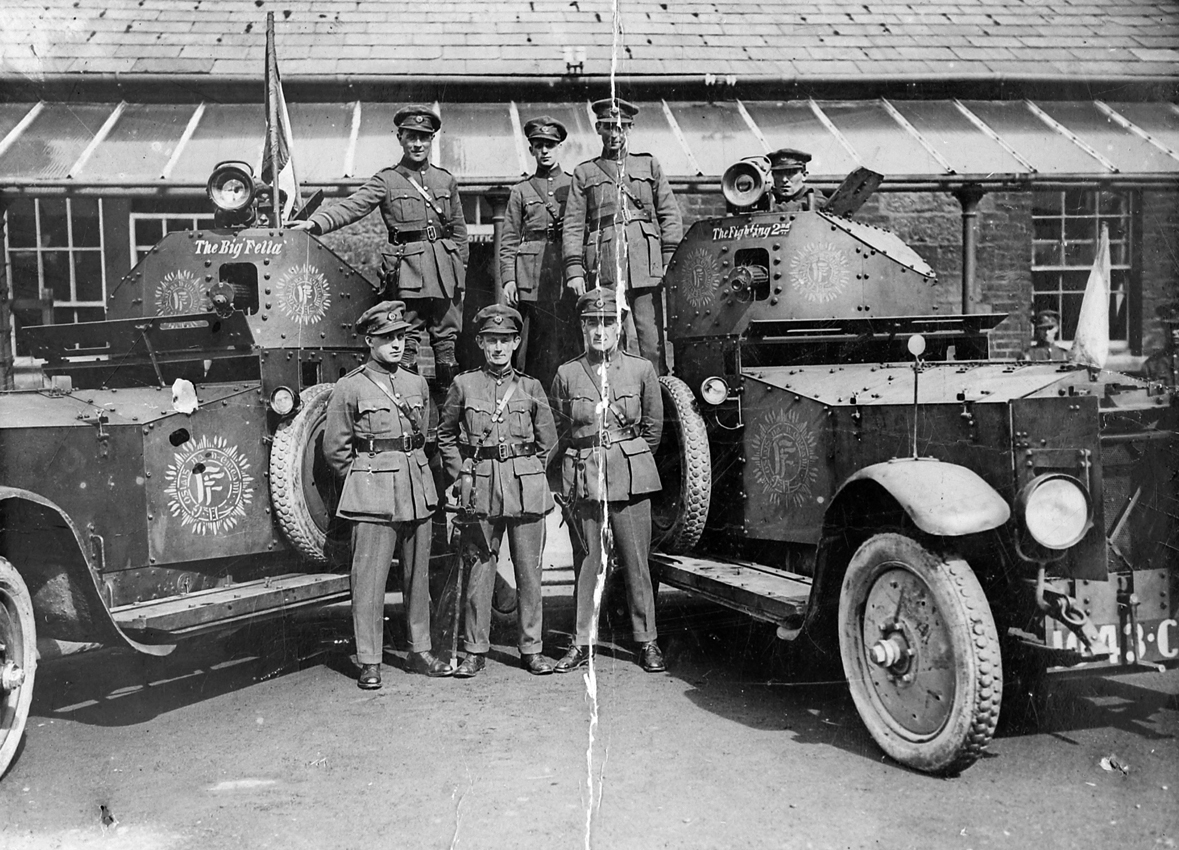
Two of the 13 Rolls-Royce armoured cars used during the Civil War: The Fighting 2nd (ARR3) and The Big Fella (ARR8)

During the Irish Civil War, 13 Rolls-Royce armoured cars armed with Vickers machine guns were handed over to the National Army by the British government. All remained in service with the Irish Defence Forces until after 1945, when following the end of The Emergency they were phased out as the peacetime army shrank. Twelve were sold in the mid-1950s with one retained.

The Defence Forces preserved one Rolls-Royce armoured car, named Sliabh na mBan, as it was believed to be the actual Rolls-Royce that accompanied Michael Collins's convoy when he was killed. ARR2 Sliabh na mBan, which is reputed to be one of the world's oldest serving armoured vehicles, is displayed in the Curragh Military Museum and used for ceremonial purposes.

Another Irish Rolls-Royce armoured car, ARR1 Tom Keogh, has been restored by a private individual, and another 1920 pattern Rolls-Royce armoured car (which is not one of the Irish ARRs) is on display at Bovington tank museum.

== Peerless armoured car ==
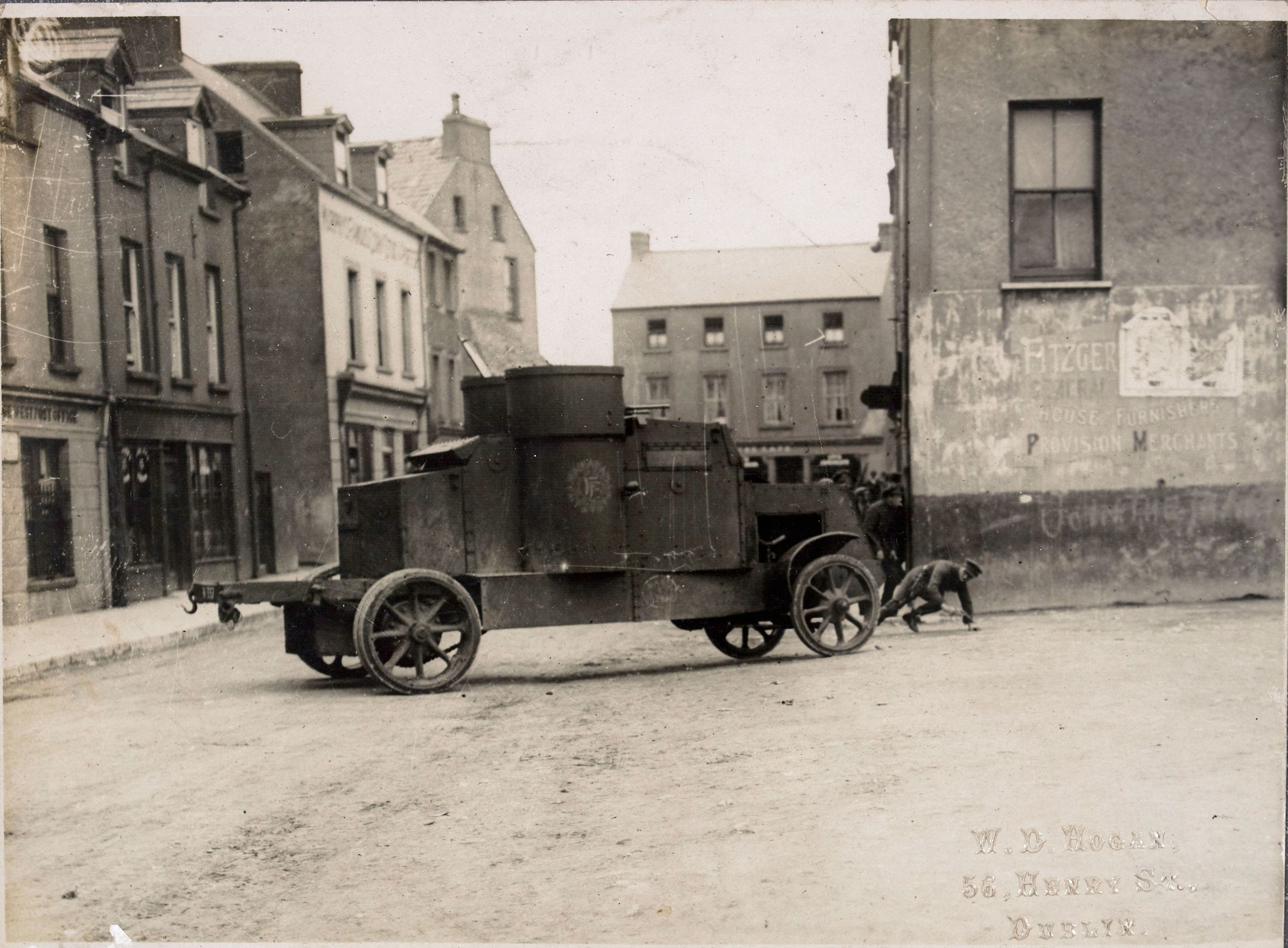
Peerless armoured car in County Cork during the civil war

The Irish National Army received seven Peerless armoured cars during the Irish Civil War and these were used by the Irish Defence Forces up until 1932. The Peerless armoured cars were fitted with two turrets each both armed with a single Hotchkiss machine gun. In 1935, 4 Irish Peerless armoured hulls were mounted on modified Leyland Terrier 6x4 chassis. A year later their twin turrets were replaced by a single Landsverk L60 tank turret. This new vehicle was known as the Leyland armoured car and remained in Irish service until the early 1980s. The fourteen old Irish Peerless turrets and its Hotchkiss machine guns were fitted to Irish built vehicles in 1940 called the Ford Mk V armoured car. A single replica (AP1) has been preserved as part of the Curragh Cavalry Collection.

== Lancia armoured car ==
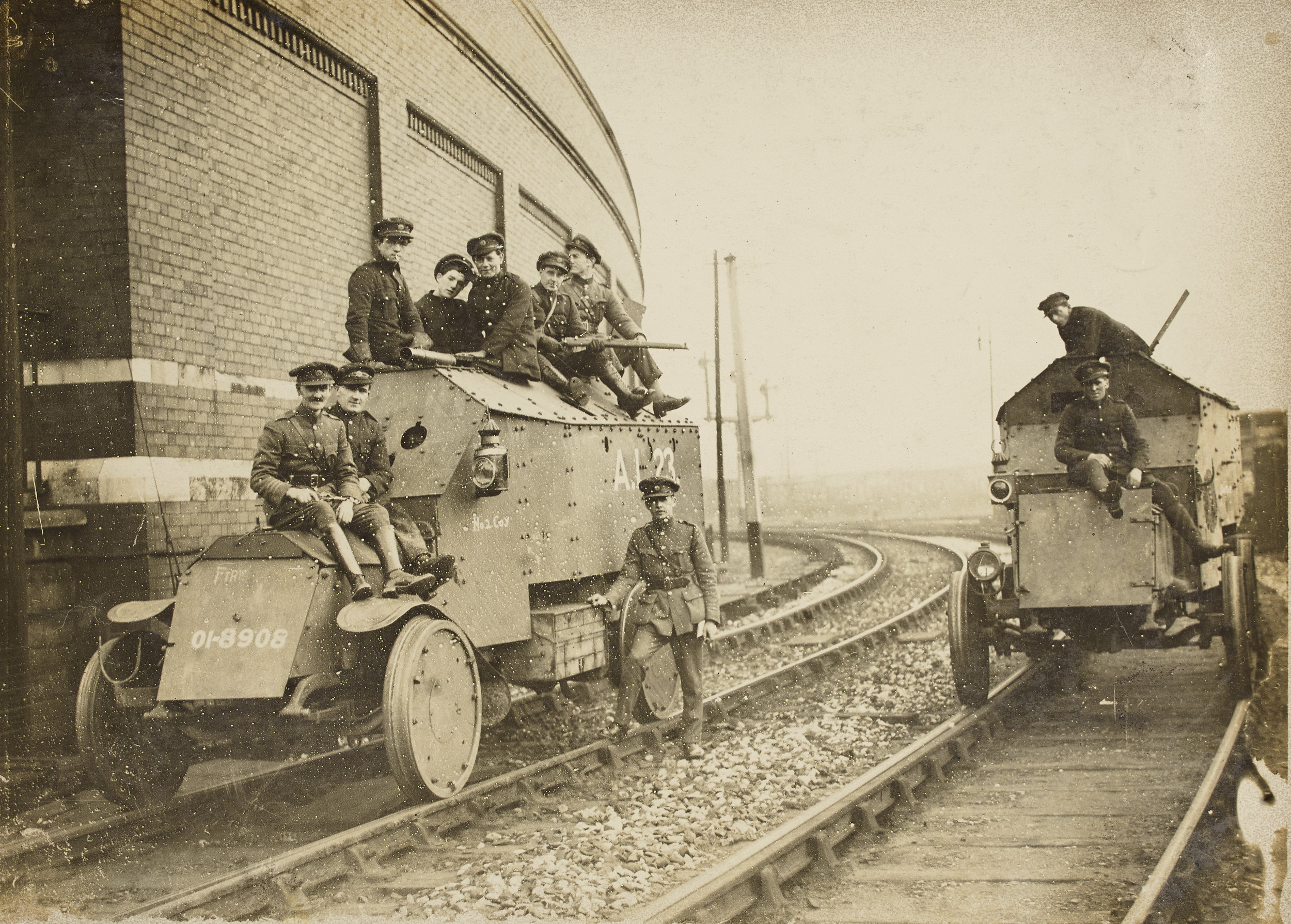
Armoured Lancia 1922 model

The Lancia armoured cars were built by the Great Southern and Western Railway workshops, Dublin, in 1921 for the Royal Irish Constabulary. 111 Lancias were received by the Irish National Army and all were disposed of by 1937. As many as fifty Lancias were fitted with railway wheels and used by the Railway Protection, Repair and Maintenance Corps for railway patrols.

== Vickers Mk. D tank ==
The Vickers Mk. D was a one-off design built for the Irish Free State and delivered in 1929. It was developed from the Vickers Medium Mark II tank but had a more powerful, water cooled, rear mounted, 6-cylinder Sunbeam Amazon petrol engine, developing 170 bhp at 2100 rpm and a 6 pdr gun was fitted. As many as four Vickers .303 machine guns could be fitted. When the tank was scrapped in 1940 the 6 pounder gun was removed and used as an anti-tank weapon.

== Landsverk L60 light tank ==
The first Irish Landsverk L60 light tank was delivered in 1935 and joined Ireland's only other tank the Vickers Mk. D in the 2nd Armoured Squadron. The second Landsverk L60 arrived in 1936. They were both armed with a Madsen 20 mm cannon and a Madsen .303 Machine Guns.

In January 1933 the army examined options for a new armoured fighting vehicle capable of countering a tank attack, during the assumed scenario of a resumed war with Britain. The board looked at three new light tanks, considering two models built by Vickers, before deciding in favour of the L-60 built by AB Landsverk. The L-60 was significantly more expensive than the two Vickers models but the army insisted that only the L-60 met the army's requirements; so much so that it was "practically identical with the tank" envisioned by the board. The army hoped to begin domestic manufacturing of the chosen tank believing that "national economic and defence policy demands that tanks should be manufactured in Ireland". To this end the army wanted components and assembly instructions for two further vehicles alongside the first delivered example to develop practical experience of manufacturing tanks ahead of full-scale production. The Department of Finance believed the army's cost estimates had no sound basis and was of the opinion that there was "no future for any Irish firm in the manufacture or even in the assembly of tanks" in Ireland. Minister for Finance Seán MacEntee rejected the parts import idea and only authorised funds for a second L-60 tank. However, Minister for Defence Frank Aiken persisted in trying to persuade MacEntee throughout February and March 1934 of the viability of the plan assuring him that it would be affordable and "pave the way for the possible development of a mechanical industry in this line". McEntee's acting assistant secretary Walter Doolin pointed out that not a single Irish engineering firm had expressed any interest in assembling the tanks and by April the army conceded, with only one further complete tank being purchased from AB Landsverk. This purchase was delayed when the second tank was destroyed in an accidental fire during tests in Sweden and a number of years passed before the free replacement arrived in Ireland. The Landsverks were still in use up until the late 1960s. One L60 is preserved in running order by the Army and the other is in the National Museum of Ireland, Collins Barracks, Dublin.

== Leyland armoured car ==
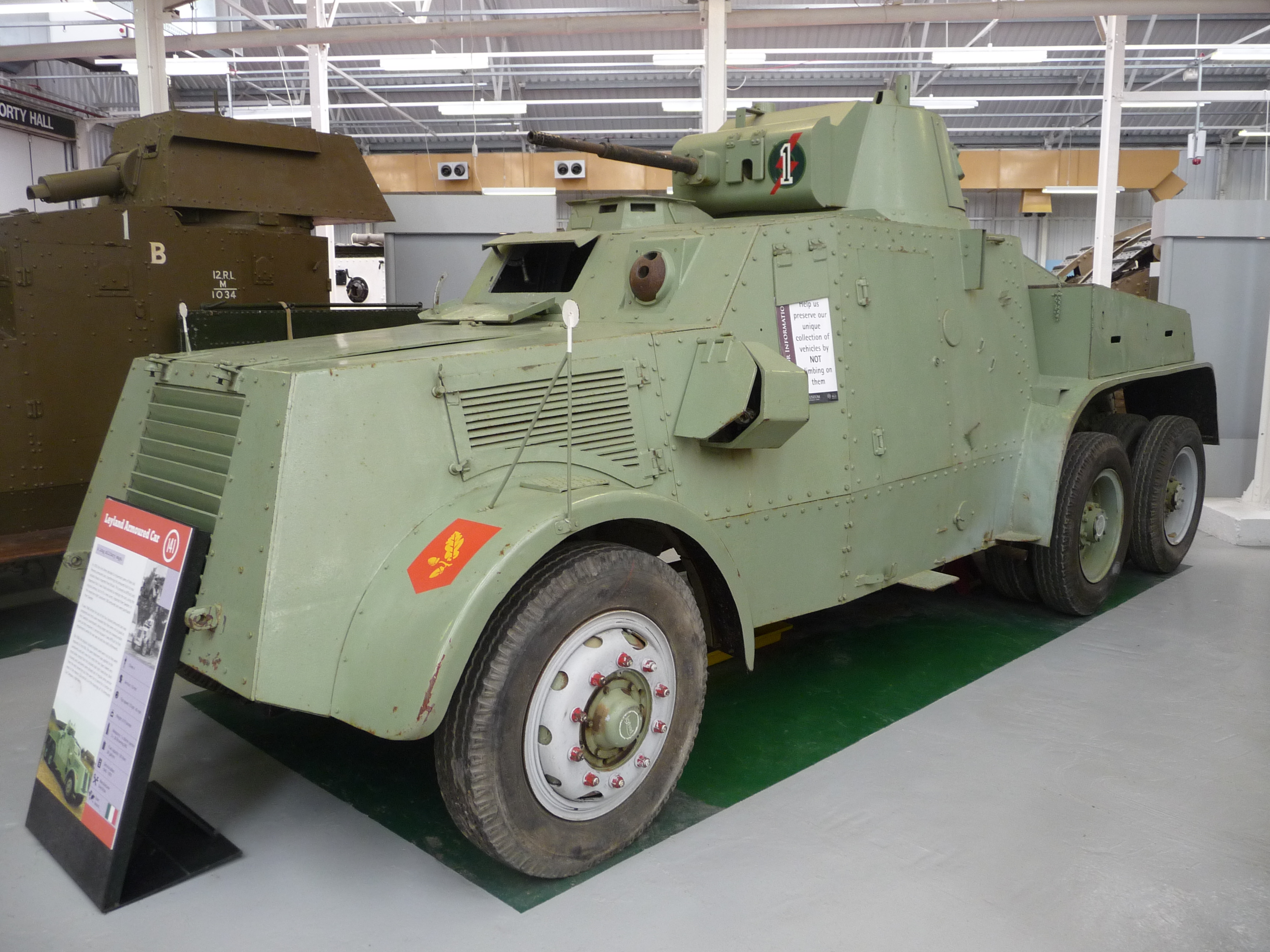
Leyland armoured car

The Leyland armoured car was based on a 6x4 Leyland Terrier lorry chassis. The first chassis was purchased from Ashenhurst of Dublin in 1934 and an armoured hull from an obsolete Peerless armoured car was modified and fitted. The new vehicle was tested and it was recommended that the twin Peerless turrets be replaced with a single turret. In 1935 3 more Leyland Terrier chassis were bought and the Landsverk L60 tank turret was selected in 1936 to replace the twin Peerless turrets, however it was not until 1940 that all four Leyland armoured cars were finished. The armament of the Leylands was a Madsen 20 mm cannon and a Madsen .303 machine gun. The Leylands entered service with the 1st Armoured Squadron alongside the Landsverk L180 and Irish-built Dodge armoured cars. In the 1958 the Leylands front hull was modified and were re-engined with Ford V-8s and .30 Browning machine guns replaced the Madsens plus another Browning was fitted in the hull next to the driver.

One of the Leylands was scrapped in the 1960s. In 1972 the 1st Armoured Squadron re-equipped with Panhard AML armoured cars and the three surviving Leylands joined the reserve FCA 5th Motor Squadron until they also re-equipped with Panhard AMLs in the early 1980s.

== Landsverk L180 armoured car ==
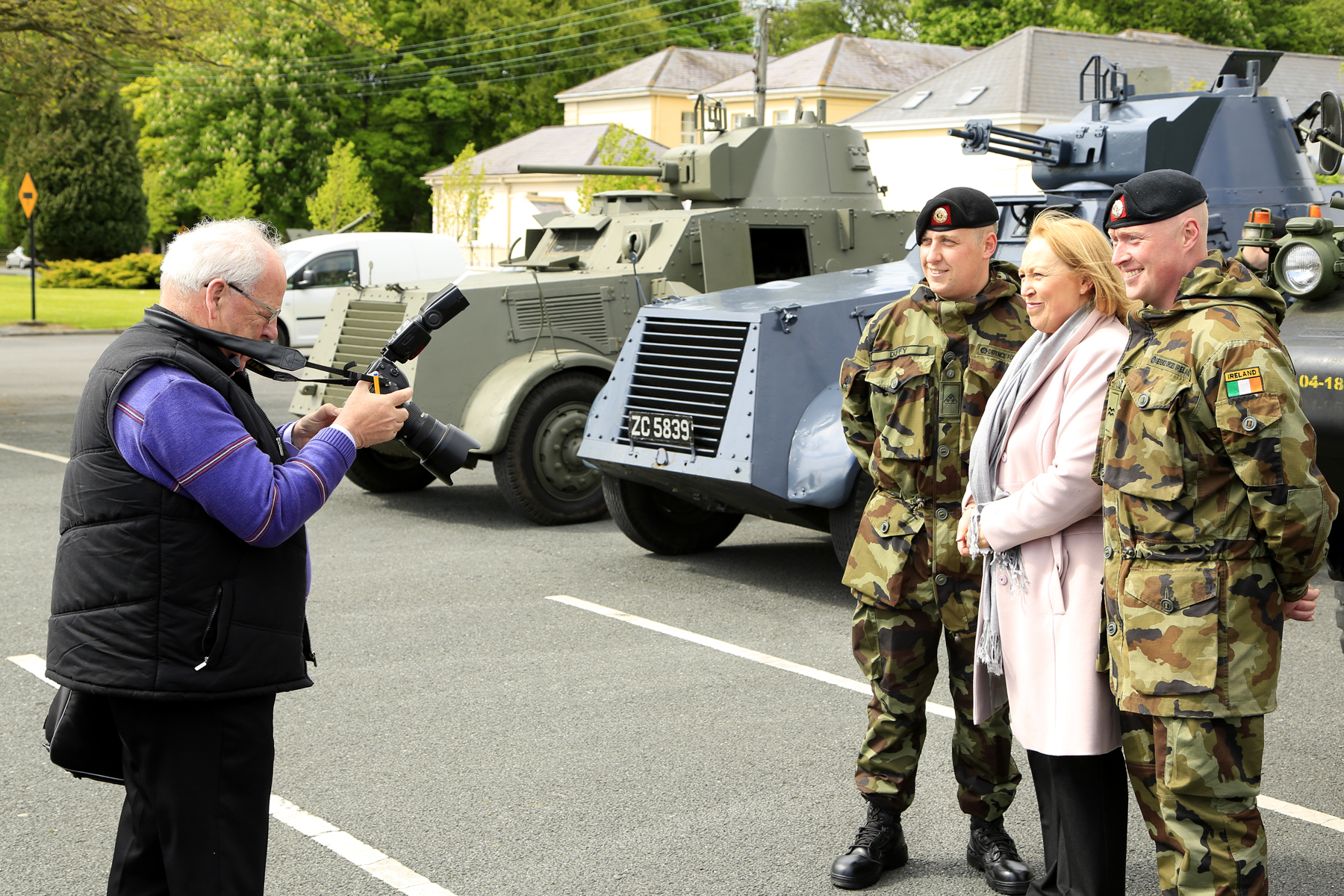
Historical Irish Army armoured vehicles, including Landsverk L180 (registration ZC5839) of the Irish Army Museum at the Curragh

Ireland ordered its first 2 Landsverk L180s in 1937 and were delivered the following year. 6 more were then ordered and they were delivered in 1939. A further 5 were ordered but could not be delivered because of the outbreak of the world war. These 5 were used instead by the Swedish army under the designation Pbil m/41. Irish Landsverk L180s were armed with a Madsen 20mm Cannon and 2 Madsen .303 Machine Guns. The Madsen machine guns were replaced with .30 Browning machine guns in the 1950s and the 20mm cannon was replaced in the 1970s with Hispano-Suiza 20 mm cannons take from former Irish Air Corps De Havilland Vampire jets. In 1956-1957 the Landsverks original Büssing-NAG L8V V8-cylinder petrol engines were replaced with 5,195cc Ford V8 type 317 petrol developing 155 hp at 3,200rpm. The refit also saw the installation of a hydraulic clutch, radio mountings and altered machine gun mountings to take .30 Browning machine guns supplied by the Air Corps and All Irish Landsverks belonged to the 1st Armoured Squadron and used alongside the Irish built Leyland and Dodge armoured cars until they re-equip with Panhard AML armoured cars in 1972. The Landsverks were then transferred to the reserve FCA units, five going to the 11th Motor Squadron, until they were retired in the 1980s. A Landsverk formerly of the 11th Motor Squadron was gifted to the Netherlands in a formal ceremony at the Curragh in November 1982.

== GSR Morris Mk IV armoured car ==
In 1940 a Defence Forces committee decided to build 8 improvised armoured cars on lorry chassis for the protection of aerodromes. The Army purchased eight second-hand Morris Commercial lorries and one was delivered to Great Southern Railways (GSR) workshops for them to build and fit an armoured body. The GSR Morris Mk IV armoured car had no turret instead the machine gun crew had to fire through loopholes. After the building of the first Morris armoured car it was decided to change the role of the planned new vehicles from aerodrome defence to the same role as a regular armoured car. For this role a better chassis and engine was needed than that of Morris Commercial lorries so the seven remaining improvised armoured cars were built on Ford chassis and were known as the GSR Ford Mk IV, they were transferred to the army's Supply and Transport Corps. The Morris Mk IV was disposed of in 1946.

== GSR Ford Mk IV armoured car ==
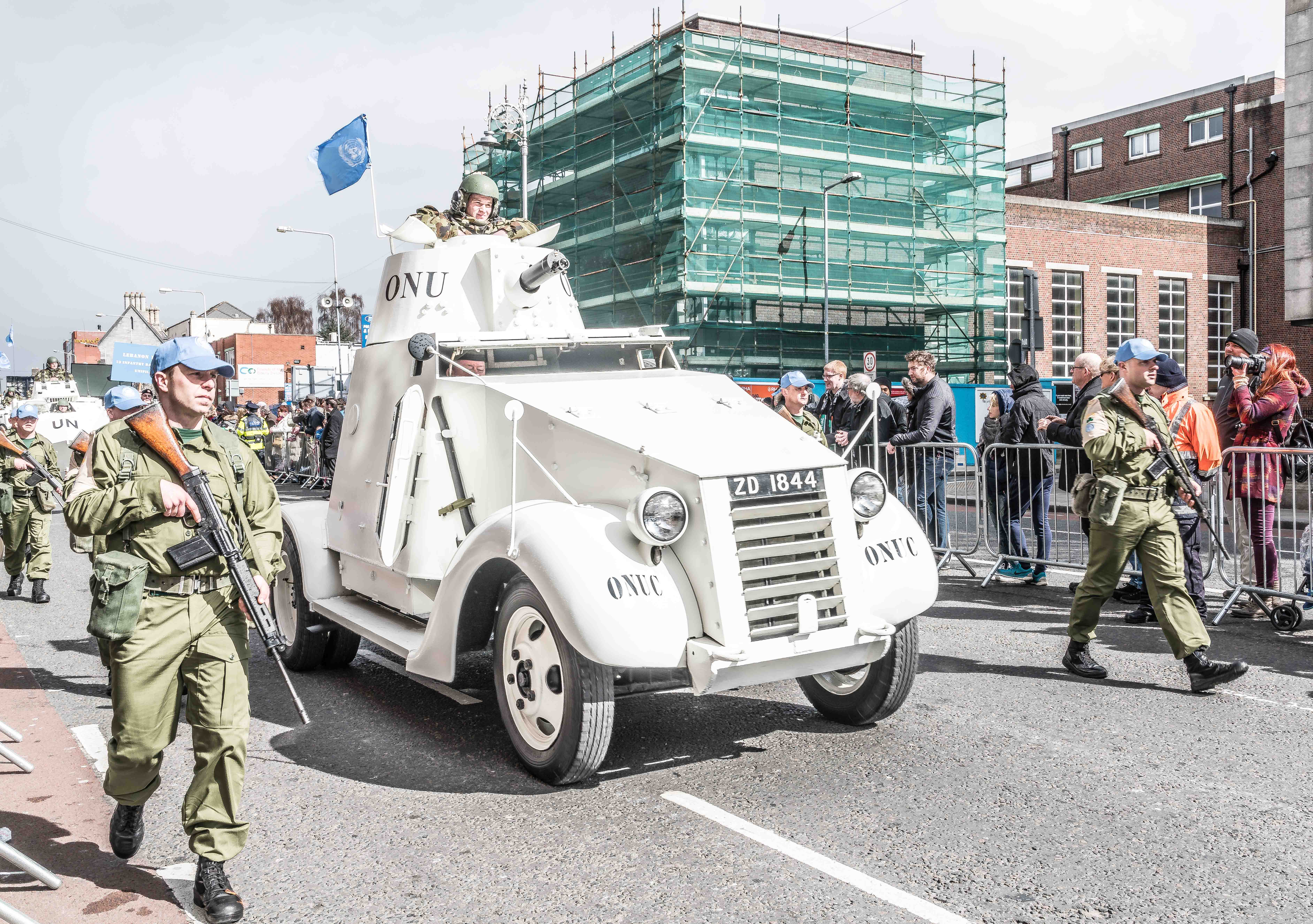
Thompson Ford Mk 6 armoured car (ZD 1844) in UN ONUC (Congo) livery during Easter Rising commemorative parade, Dublin 2016

The seven GSR Ford Mk IV armoured cars were also built by Great Southern Railways (GSR) and were similar to the Morris Mk IV but a turret with Hotchkiss machine gun also built by GSR was fitted. All the Ford Mk IVs were built and delivered in 1940. The army sold all 7 Ford Mk IVs in 1954.

== Ford Mk V armoured car ==
In 1940, Thompson & Son of Carlow built 14 Ford Mk V armoured cars. The Ford Mk V was cheaper and had better performance than the GSR Ford Mk IV armoured cars. The old Peerless armoured car turrets and their Hotchkiss machine guns were fitted. All Ford Mk Vs were sold in 1954.

== Ford Mk VI armoured car ==
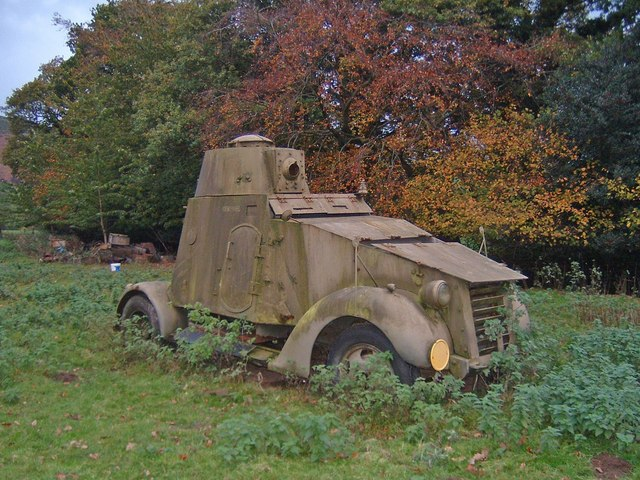
Abandoned Ford Mk. VI

In 1941, Thompson & Son of Carlow built 28 more Ford armoured cars. 21 of the armoured cars were built on new chassis, and the other seven built on Ford lorries which had been withdrawn from service. These 28 armoured cars were similar to the Ford Mk V but had a Thompsons-built turret and the new vehicle was named the Ford Mk VI armoured car. The turret was armed with a Vickers .303 machine gun.

The first major overseas deployment of Irish troops was to the Congo in 1960, as part of the UN force ONUC. In 1961, an armoured car group with eight Ford Mk VI armoured cars was flown to the Congo. Three more Ford Mk VIs were sent out later that year to the Congo, two of which had their turrets removed and a pintle-mounted Bren light machine gun fitted in its place. The Brens on the two Ford Mk VIs were replaced in the Congo with Browning .30 machine gun. In 1962, the UN provided the Irish with twelve new Ferret armoured cars to replace the Ford Mk VIs. In 1964, six of the Ford Mk VIs were handed over to the Congolese Army.

The 17 Ford Mk VIs in Ireland were retired in the early 1970s.

== Bren carrier ==
External image
- Universal (Bren) carrier images from Defence Forces archives

26 Universal Carriers Mk I were purchased in 1940. 100 Universal Carriers Mk II were delivered in 1943 and another 100 Mk IIs in 1945. The vehicles were referred to as 'Bren Carriers' by Irish troops. The first 26 Bren Carriers were grouped together to form the Carrier Squadron of the Cavalry Corps. The Carrier Squadron was disbanded in 1943 and its carriers distributed amongst the army's infantry battalions. All 200 of the Bren Carriers Mk IIs were used by the infantry battalions mainly for transporting its 3-inch and Brandt 81 mm mortars, ammo and crew. Later 2 Mk IIs were fitted with flamethrowers for use by the Corps of Engineers. A number were used in the late 1940s to tow 6 pdr anti-tank guns and 4 were used by the Cavalry School. The Bren Carriers were retired from service in the early 1960s. With 226 Universal Carriers in Irish service it is the most numerous armoured vehicle ever used by the Irish Army.

== Dodge Mark VII and Mark VIII armoured cars ==
The first Dodge armoured car was built in 1942, four more were completed by 1943 and remained in service until 1962. These armoured cars were built on a Dodge TF-37 shortened truck chassis. All five trucks were withdrawn from the army's Supply and Transport Corps. Two of the armoured cars were each armed with a Madsen 20 mm Cannon that were formerly used on Irish Marine Service Motor Torpedo Boats and a Madsen .303 Machine Gun. The other three armoured cars were armed with a Vickers .50 Machine Gun and Vickers .303 Machine Gun each. The Madsen-armed Dodges were called the Mark VII armoured car and the Vickers-armed Dodges the Mark VIII armoured car. The Dodges were used alongside the Landsverk L180 and Irish-built Leyland armoured cars in the 1st Armoured Squadron until they were all disposed of in 1962.

== Beaverette armoured car ==
The army acquired several Beaverette armoured cars at the time of The Emergency (World War II). In the 1950s the army converted several Beaverettes into open scout cars – with one such conversion preserved at the Curragh Camp in County Kildare.

== Churchill tank ==
The Irish Army took delivery of three Churchill Mk VI tanks in 1948 and a fourth in 1949. They were rented from the British War Office until 1954, when they were purchased outright. This purchase was despite the fact that the supply and transport corps workshops, who maintained them, had reported that spares had all but run out. Experiments were carried out involving replacing the existing Bedford engine with a Rolls-Royce Merlin engine salvaged from an Irish Air Corps Seafire aircraft. The experiment was a success but not repeated although the reasons why are not recorded. By 1967 only one Churchill remained serviceable, and by 1969 all were retired. The Churchill Mk VI was armed with an Ordnance QF 75 mm gun and 2 Besa 7.92mm machine guns. One of these Churchills is in the collection of a museum in Northern Ireland. To transport the Churchills, Ireland acquired a Diamond T tank transporter.

== Comet tank ==
Four ex British Army Comet tanks were delivered to the Irish Army in 1959 and a further four in 1960. The Comet was armed with a 77 mm HV gun and 2 Besa 7.92mm machine guns. Severe budget cutbacks were to severely harm the service lives of the Comets, as not enough spares were purchased. The Comet appealed to the Irish Army as it was cheap to buy and run, had low ground pressure, and good anti-tank capability. In retrospect, it was an excellent buy, and would have stood the army in good stead had vital spares been supplied initially. However, faulty fuzes meant the withdrawal of the HE ammunition, limiting the tank's role to an anti-tank vehicle. As spare parts became scarce less mobile tanks were cannibalised to keep one Comet running, and by the mid-1970s the Comet was used as a training vehicle for mechanics.

With stocks of 77 mm ammunition, particularly High Explosive (which were found to be faulty and were withdrawn entirely), dwindling in 1969, the army began an experiment to prolong the life of the vehicle. A fire-damaged vehicle with no turret, the 'Headless Coachman', had been used as a range target tug. This was then given an open mounting consisting of a length of steel girder welded to the turret ring with a 90 mm Bofors Pv-1110 recoilless rifle. Metal plates were also welded to the rear of the turret ring to prevent backblast from entering the fighting compartment. As well as traversing on the existing turret ring, the recoilless rifle could also be aimed using the original gun mounting allowing finer adjustment. The prototype was successfully tested at the Glen of Imaal on 27 January 1969. The positive results from these tests led to further development of the prototype being greenlit, including ammo racks and a sloped steel shield protecting the exposed crew. The army also considered mounting a second 90mm recoilless rifle to allow for rapid follow-up fire. Transforming another Comet tank into a self-propelled mortar carrier with two 81mm mortars or one 120mm was also discussed. Lack of funds saw a cancellation of the project.

The last 77 mm Comet shoot occurred in 1973, and the tanks were withdrawn soon afterwards. One is preserved in the Curragh Camp in running condition, and two more are on static display, also in the Curragh, and one in Athlone barracks.

In 1975, an Irish Army officer writing in An Cosantóir suggested that, similar to the Israeli Super Sherman, the Comet tanks (then in storage) could have a new engine installed and be upgunned with the British 105 mm gun. The proposals were not implemented.

== M113 armoured personnel carrier ==
Six M113 armoured personnel carriers were loaned to Irish troops in the Congo operating as part of the UN force ONUC. The M113s were United States Army vehicles donated to the UN for the Congo peacekeeping force mission. Following the withdrawal of Indian Army soldiers due to the Sino-Indian War, Irish from the armoured car group took over responsibility for their position in Jadotville assuming control of six M113s and several Swedish APCs. The M113 APC was a significant improvement over the Ford armoured cars and Swedish APCs used by the Irish forces up to then; easy to handle, tracked, amphibious and armed with a pintle-mount M2 Browning .50 machine gun. The vehicles were withdrawn early from the armoured car group in the Congo and returned to US Army inventory. M113 was and is the only tracked APC in Irish service.

== Tgb m/42 KP armoured personnel carrier ==
A small number of Swedish Tgb m/42 KP APCs were loaned from UN stocks during operations in the Congo and returned in early 1963. One is preserved in a driving condition in the Curragh Camp having been obtained in the early 2000s.

== Ferret armoured car ==
Twelve Ferret armoured cars were loaned to Irish troops in the Congo in 1962, equipping the newly-assembly 2nd Armoured Car Squadron for independent reconnaissance missions. The twelve Ferrets were shipped by sea from England and reached the unit by November 1962. The Ferrets were transferred to the replacement 3rd Armoured Car Squadron who in June faced a revolt of the Congo Civilian Police, and in September was placed on red alert during a general strike. After a year of training and patrolling the Ferrets were returned to UN stores.

== Panhard AML armoured car ==
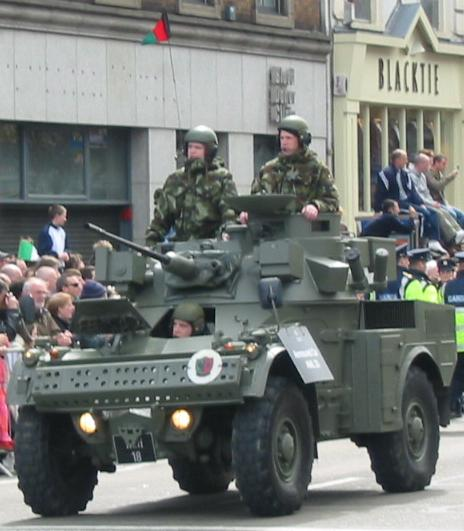
Irish Panhard AML 20 on parade in 2006

External image
- Panhard AML 60 with M242 Bushmaster autocannon image from Defence Forces archives

In 1964 the first 2 Panhard AML 60-7 CS armoured cars were delivered to Ireland. These 2 Panhards were then shipped to the Irish battalion that was part of the UN force UNFICYP in Cyprus. Six more Panhard AML 60-7 CS armoured cars were shipped directly from France to the Irish troops in Cyprus. Later in the same year another eight Panhard AML 60-7 CS armoured cars were delivered. The army ordered in 1970 20 AML 90 and 16 Panhard AML 60-7 HB armoured cars, all of which were delivered by 1975.

The AML 60-7 CS variant was armed with a DTAT Cloche Special (CS) 60mm mortar and twin AA-52 7.62mm machine guns. The AML 60-7 HB was armed with a Hotchkiss-Brandt (HB) 60mm mortar and twin FN MAG 7.62mm machine guns. The AML 90 was fitted with a H-90 turret armed with a D 921 F1 90mm gun and co-axial FN MAG 7.62mm machine gun. In the late 1970s the mortars fitted to all 16 AML 60-7 CS armoured cars could not be fired due to a fault, and as a result its twin 7.62mm machine guns became its main armament. In 1986 a single vehicle had installed a Creusot-Loire T25 turret armed with a M242 Bushmaster 25 mm (25×137mm) autocannon and was tested in the Glen of Imaal. A further vehicle was modified with the same turret as the FV107 Scimitar mounting a 30 mm RARDEN autocannon. In 1989 the 16 AML 60-7 CS armoured cars' twin 7.62 mm machine guns were replaced with a single M2 Browning .5 machine gun each. In 1999 the 16 AML 60-7 CS armoured cars turrets were rearmed with a G12 20 mm cannon and a co-axial FN MAG 7.62mm machine gun. It was known as the AML 20.

The AML 60s were used on peacekeeping missions in Cyprus, the AML 90s in Lebanon and both the AML 20s and AML 90s in Liberia. AML 90s were also deployed in an internal security role following the kidnapping of supermarket executive Don Tidey by the Provisional IRA in 1983. The remaining AML fleet was retired from service in 2013, and sold to a French buyer in 2015 (19 vehicles were sold).

One Irish AML-90 is (as of 2025) in museum at Spike Island.

== Landsverk Unimog scout car ==
The Landsverk Unimog scout car was based on the Unimog S404 truck and were built in the late 1950s. The Irish Army purchased 15 of the vehicles at a bargain price in 1971 which were originally intended for the police force in the Belgian Congo. They were intended as a stop-gap vehicle for use until the first Panhard M3 APCs entered service in 1972. The Cavalry Workshops modified the Unimog scout cars by fitting a shield that could mount a FN MAG 7.62mm machine gun to it on the roof opening. The type had excellent off-road capability but poor on-road handling due to a high centre of gravity and several accidents occurred as a result. Equipped with a four-man dismountable squad arrangement was carried, but space was cramped, and in any case a four-man detachment was far too small for any sort of realistic military purpose. Other criticisms were that the FN MAG gunner's position was too exposed. By mid-1978 all had been transferred to the Reserve FCA Motor Squadrons. As the FCA did not use the FN MAG it armed its Unimog scout cars with Browning .30 or Bren .303 machine guns. All Unimog scout cars were withdrawn by 1984.

== Panhard armoured personnel carrier ==
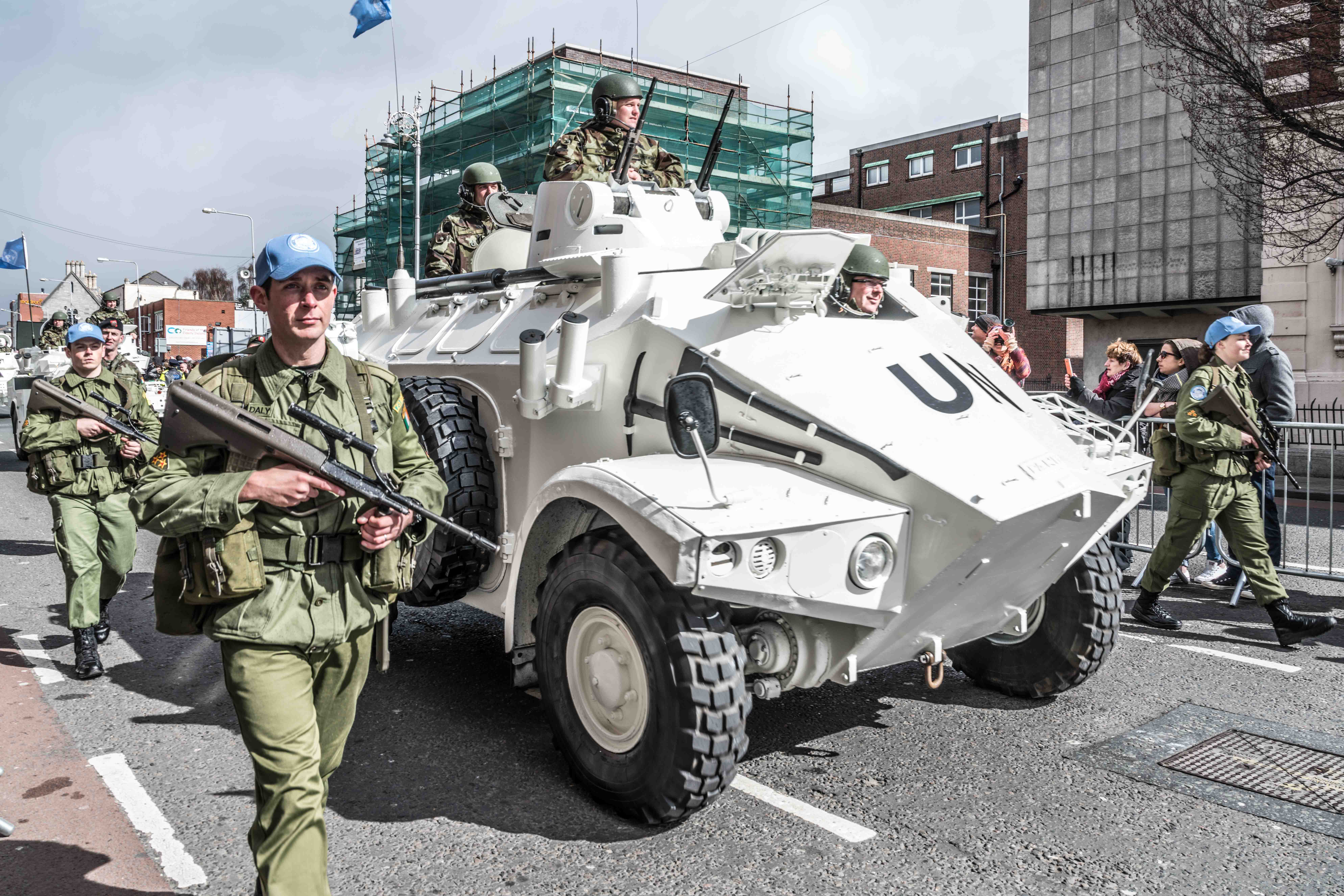
Historic Irish Panhard M3 (in UN colours) during a 2016 parade

Production of the Panhard M3 VTT armoured personnel carrier started in 1971 and the Irish Army ordered 60. The first 17 were of the Panhard M3 APCs were delivered in 1972. The Panhard M3 APC used 95% of the components of the Panhard AML armoured cars. A Creusot-Loire TL.21.80 turret was fitted to all 60 Irish Panhard APCs armed with twin FN MAG 7.62mm machine guns. 14 Panhard APCs were sent to Lebanon in 1978 with the Irish battalion serving with UNIFIL. At home the Panhard APCs were distributed among the army's 9 infantry battalions and 4 cavalry squadrons. The UN supplied the Irish troops in Lebanon in 1989 with 10 SISU XA-180 6x6 APCs to replace its Panhard APCs and the 14 Panhards were sent back to Ireland and later scrapped. 14 Panhard M3 APCs were around until the early 2000s and the rest of them were gone by 1996.

== Timoney armoured personnel carrier ==
Timoney, a County Meath based company, designed and built three one-off prototype 4x4 wheeled APCs designated Marks I, II, III for tests by the Irish army between 1972 and 1974. In 1977 the army ordered five APCs based on the Mk III design known as the Timoney Mk IV APC. These were delivered in 1978, fitted with a Timoney built turret armed with twin FN MAG 7.62mm machine guns. The vehicles suffered from a number of mechanical problems and all were out of service by the late 1980s. In 1981 the army ordered five improved Timoney Mk VI APCs which were delivered in 1983, fitted with a Creusot-Loire TLi 127 turret armed with a M2 Browning .5 machine gun and a FN MAG 7.62mm machine guns each. The Timoney Mk VI APCs were used by the army until 1999.

== Scorpion armoured reconnaissance vehicle ==
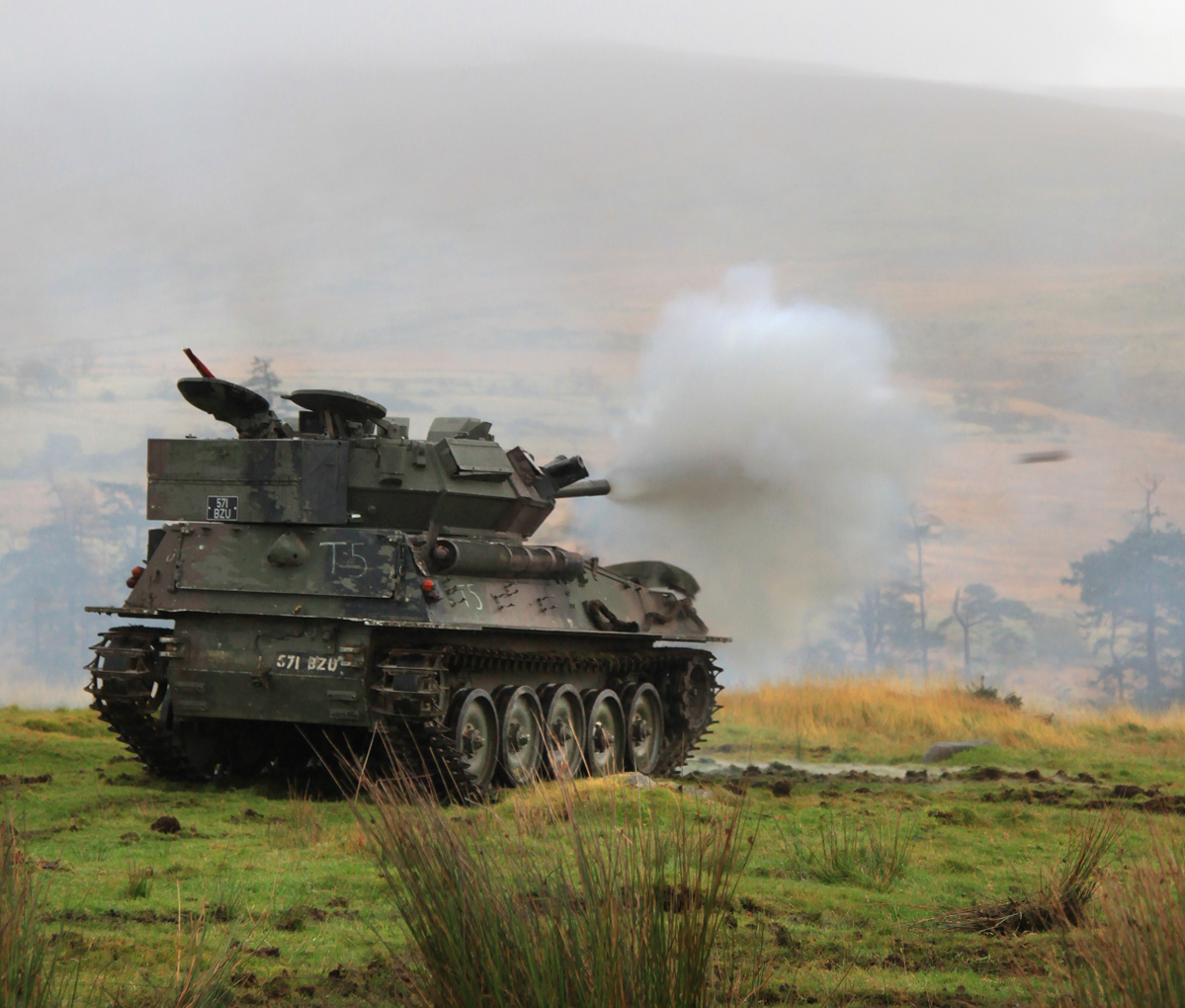
Irish Army Scorpion during a shoot in the Glen of Imaal

Originally designed for the British Army, the Scorpion armoured reconnaissance vehicle began production in the early 1970s, and was in use with the Irish Army from 1980 until 2017. The army bought 4 Scorpions each year from 1980 to 1982 plus 2 more in 1985 bringing the total in Irish service to 14. The Scorpion had three crew members and a maximum speed of 70 kilometres per hour. In Irish service, it was primarily armed with a 76mm rifled gun and a 7.62mm coaxial mounted machine gun.

One Irish Scorpion is (as of 2025) in museum at Spike Island.

== SISU armoured personnel carrier ==
The UN supplied the Irish troops serving with UNIFIL in Lebanon in 1989 with 10 SISU XA-180 6x6 APCs to replace its 14 Panhard APCs. The Irish Army purchased 2 SISU APCs in 1990 as training vehicles for soldiers preparing for service with UNIFIL. The 2 Irish SISU APCs were sent to Somalia in 1993 for use by Irish troops serving with UNOSOM II and returned to Ireland in 1994. Both Irish SISUs and the 10 UN SISUs in Irish use were fitted with the same Creusot-Loire TL.21.80 turret with twin FN MAG 7.62mm machine guns as the Panhard APC.

== Mowag Eagle IV ==
The Mowag Eagle IV was used by Army Ranger Wing soldiers conducting a field human intelligence role for MINUSMA as part of a German task force.

== MOWAG armoured personnel carrier ==
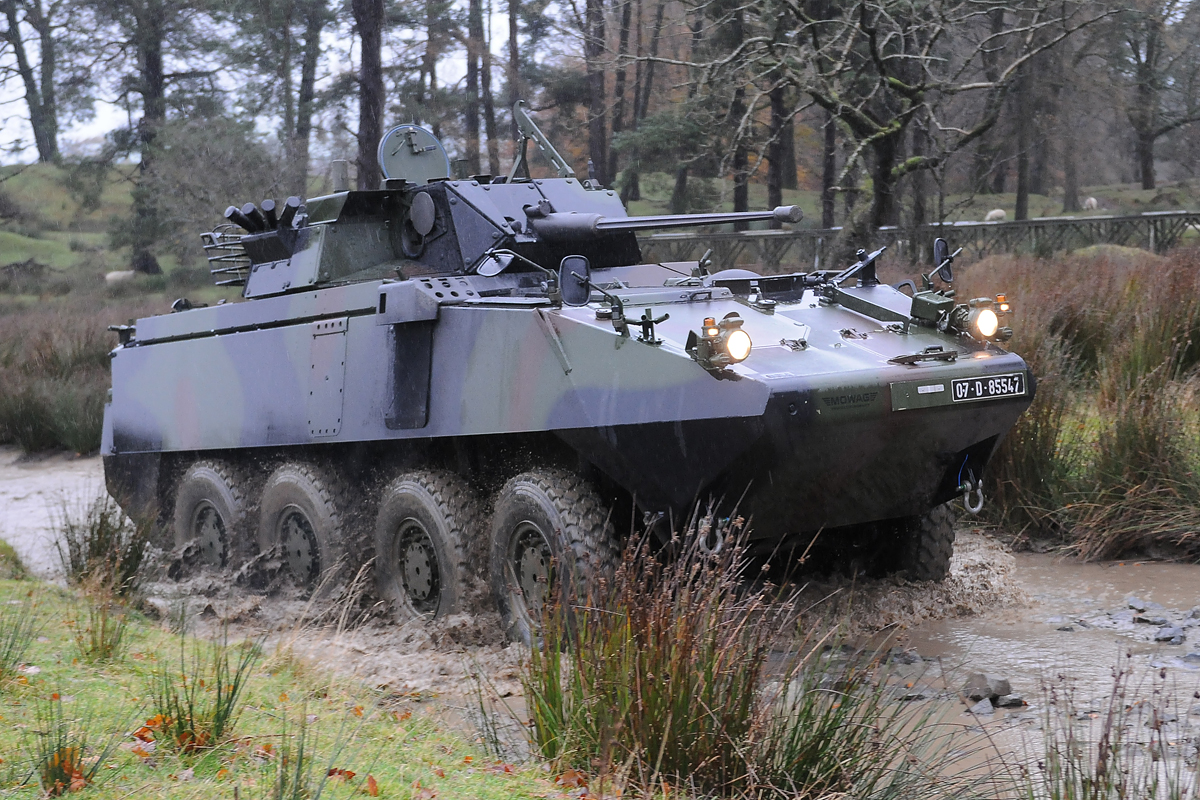
Irish Army Mowag Piranha IIIH MRV

The Mowag Piranha IIIH 8x8 armoured personnel carrier (APC) has been used by the Irish Army since 2001. There are 80 Mowags in service with the army, in 6 different variant types. Forty-five are armoured personnel carriers, eight are command vehicles, two are armoured ambulances, one is a recovery vehicle, eighteen are cavalry Recce vehicles (CRV) and six are medium Recce vehicles (MRV).

The APC variant of the Mowag has a crew of two and can carry a nine-man infantry section. It has a maximum speed of 100 kilometres per hour, and is fitted with a one-man turret armed with one .50 (12.7mm) Browning HMG, one 7.62mm FN MAG machine gun and eight 66mm smoke grenade launchers. The eighteen Mowag CRVs are fitted with a Kongsberg Remote Weapon Station (RWS) and can be armed with either a 12.7mm/.5 Browning HMG or a Heckler & Koch 40mm automatic grenade launcher. The six MRVs are fitted with a 2-man turret armed with an Oto Melara 30mm cannon and 7.62mm coaxial machine gun.

The Irish Mowags have been used on peacekeeping missions in Eritrea, Liberia, Kosovo, Lebanon, Chad and Syria. As of 2016, a 6-year €55m maintenance and upgrade contract was agreed with the original Mowag manufacturer. Mid-life upgrade (MLU) for the vehicles was completed at the end of 2025.

In 2026, some Mowags were fitted with new RS6 remote weapons stations armed with 30mm M230 chain guns. As well as the standard fire support roles, these new weapons are proposed to have C-UAS (anti-drone) capability in future with the introduction of airburst proximity ammunition.

== RG-32 light tactical vehicle (RG Outrider) ==
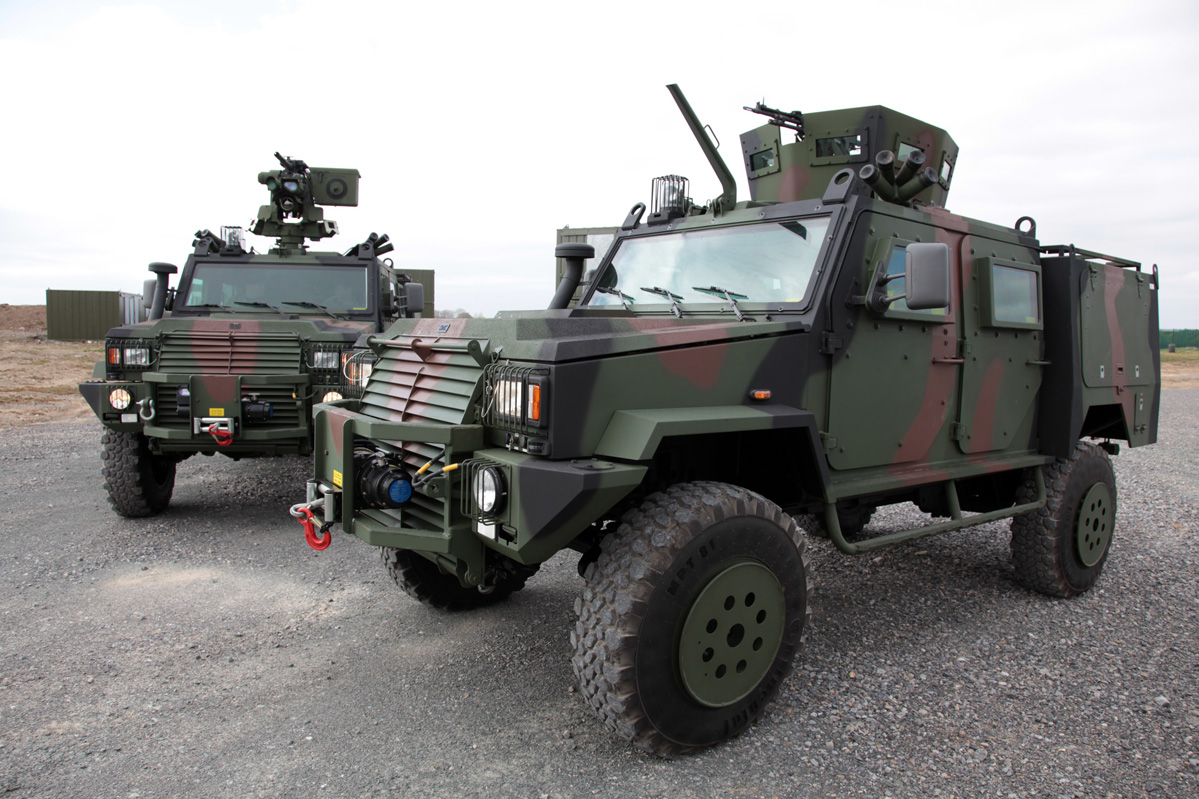
The RG-32M (Outrider) light tactical vehicle was used from 2010 to 2026

The Irish Army operated 27 RG Outrider light tactical vehicles which were delivered from BAE Systems starting in April 2010. One of the first two delivered was armed with a FN MAG 7.62mm machine gun fitted to the roof opening and the other fitted with a Kongsberg Remote Weapon Station (RWS) armed with a Heckler & Koch 40mm automatic grenade launcher. The vehicles, which reportedly had "severe reliability and maintenance issues" and therefore saw limited operational use, were all "quietly retired" and placed into storage in 2026. All 27 vehicles were offered as military aid to Ukraine in the first half of 2026, but Ukraine declined the offer, and the vehicles are expected to be scrapped.
