= Sliabh na mBan (armoured car) =

Irish armoured car (1920s to 1940s)

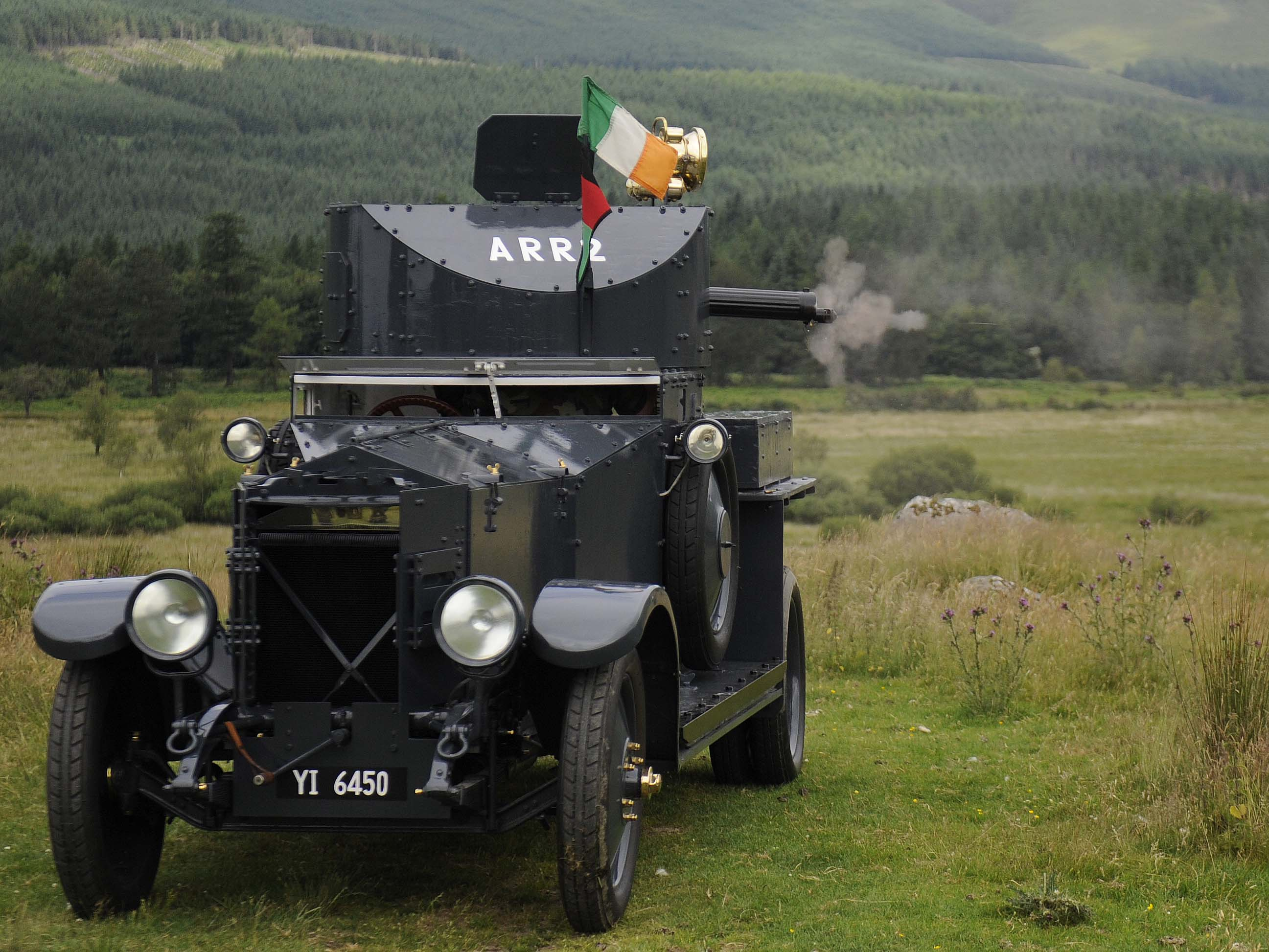
Sliabh na mBan in 2013

Sliabh na mBan (Irish: [ˈʃlʲiəw n̪ˠə ˈmˠanˠ]; formerly Slievenamon) is a Rolls-Royce armoured car that was in service with the Irish Army from the 1920s to late 1940s. The vehicle mainly saw action during the Irish Civil War, most notably as an escort for Michael Collins' convoy when it was ambushed at Béal na Bláth in August 1922. Since its withdrawal from service, Sliabh na mBan has received continued maintenance and restoration making it one of the oldest fully operational Rolls-Royce armoured cars in the world.

== Service history ==
=== Irish Civil War ===
The vehicle that would go on to be Sliabh na mBan was a part of a consignment of thirteen 1920 pattern Rolls-Royce armoured cars handed over to the newly formed National Army by Britain in early 1922. Each armoured car was then given the designation 'ARR' followed by a number ranging from 1 to 14. (Note: Possibly due to superstitious reasons there was no vehicle designated ARR 13.) The vehicles would later be given names by their crews with the Rolls-Royce ARR 2 being christened Slievenamon (the anglicisation of Sliabh na mBan) after a mountain in County Tipperary. (Note: Some sources retroactively refer to the vehicle during this period as Sliabh na mBan.) When hostilities broke out in Dublin in late June 1922, sparking a nationwide civil war, Slievenamon was one of three armoured cars which took part in the assault against anti-Treaty Republicans garrisoned in O'Connell Street.

==== Death of Michael Collins ====
Following successful pro-Treaty advances in Munster, National Army Commander-in-Chief Michael Collins embarked on a tour of the region. On 20 August, Collins left Dublin for the city of Cork in a convoy consisting of a Leyland touring car (which Collins himself travelled in), Slievenamon and a Crossley tender carrying about a dozen National Army troops. The convoy arrived in Cork City later that evening, where Collins personally met his close associate Major General Emmet Dalton. The following day, Slievenamon was temporarily taken out of escort duty to undergo servicing with the Lancia armoured personnel carrier Dublin Liz taking her place instead.

On 22 August, Collins' convoy travelled to Macroom to deliver weapons before then proceeding to Bandon. Due to a bridge on the main road being damaged by the IRA, the convoy had to use alternative routes; twice on the journey Slievenamon was unable to drive uphill and had to be pushed. During the journey, one of the men in the convoy asked a man named Denis Long for directions. Unbeknownst to those in the convoy, Long was an IRA sentry who was on lookout due to a meeting between senior IRA officers being held nearby. After being notified of Collins' presence, the IRA set up an ambush on the road near Béal na Bláth in the hope that the convoy would return through there.

From Bandon, Collins made a number of other stops at Clonakilty, Rosscarbery and Skibbereen before finally making his return to Cork. At 7:15 pm the convoy reached Béal na Bláth when it came under fire; Dalton suggested driving on, but Collins opted to stop and fight with both men and the Leyland's two drivers leaving the vehicle and taking cover. Slievenamon opened fire towards the Republicans' position, however her machine gun jammed partway through the fighting, allowing the Republicans to return fire.

During the fight, Collins – armed with a rifle – left the ditch and took cover behind Slievenamon, firing pot shots at the IRA attackers. He then left the cover of the armoured car and ran slightly further up the open road before shooting again. In the closing phase of the ambush, Collins was fatally struck in the back of his head by a bullet. Dalton, along with Commandant Sean O’Connell, managed to bring Collins' body behind Slievenamon where Dalton bandaged the headwound. When fighting had ceased, his body was moved back into the Leyland car and taken to Cork. Slievenamon would accompany Collins' body when it was taken to Dublin onboard SS Classic before returning to County Cork.

==== Capture by the IRA ====
In December 1922, Slievenamon was captured by the IRA after the car's gunner John McPeake decided to defect. McPeake managed to contact the IRA through Cumann na mBan and agreed to hand over Slievenamon to the IRA in exchange for them giving him passage to Britain, where his family lived. The theft of the armoured car went ahead on 2 December whilst it was stationed at a hotel in Bandon which was being used as a barracks by the National Army. For this operation McPeake was joined by IRA volunteer Billy Barry, who was disguised in Free State uniform. To hide their true intentions the two men explained that the car had been ordered to be relocated. However, an army officer named John Sullivan was unconvinced of Barry and McPeake's story and attempted to stop their escape by jumping on the moving vehicle but was forced off it. Barry and McPeake then their way to Kealkill, arriving there the following day.

The IRA originally intended to use the armoured car in an attack on pro-Treaty troops stationed in Inchigeelagh, but these plans were scrapped in favour of rescuing IRA volunteer Pat Hegarty, who had been arrested by Free State troops stationed in Ballymakeera and would likely face execution due to carrying a revolver. On the morning of 4 December, the IRA launched an attack into Ballymakeera against the Hibernian Hotel, where Hegarty was known to be incarcerated, with Slievenamon spearheading the assault. During the attack, Slievenamon drove up and down the main street firing an intense barrage at the hotel and a few neighbouring civilian houses, where Free State troops were billeted. The fighting ended after an IRA party snuck into the hotel through a rear entrance, compelling the troops inside to surrender and freeing Hegarty. Two Free State troops and one civilian were killed along with seventeen soldiers wounded (two mortally). The remainder of the pro-Treaty force in Ballymakeera were taken prisoner although they were all released near the Kerry border soon after. The IRA also captured the Lancia APC Pride of Dublin.

However, during the fighting, Slievenamon suffered severe damage to her wheels after multiple grenades had landed underneath her, resulting in the car having significant mobility issues. After moving the armoured car became too difficult to move, the IRA took the vehicle to Cronin's farm where it was concealed under a pile of straw and hay. Parts of the car's engine as well as its turret were removed and hidden elsewhere. In the aftermath of the Ballymakeera attack, the National Army sent out search parties first from Macroom and Cork to locate Slievenamon. After receiving some information about the whereabouts of the vehicle, the soldiers found the armoured car on the 9 December. To compensate for the car's immobility, Slievenamon was towed to Macroom first by horses and later by a lorry. The car was eventually taken to Cork, where it received its needed repairs.

=== Later service ===
After the Civil War ended in May 1923, Slievenamon would continue to serve in the National Army (later reorganised into the Defence Forces in 1924) alongside the other Rolls-Royces. From the mid 1930s, the Irish Army began to supplant their Rolls-Royces with the newer Leyland armoured cars and the procurement of Landsverk L-180s from Sweden. However, after the outbreak of World War II put a stop to imports from Sweden, the Rolls-Royces were reactivated to support Ireland's armed forces during the Emergency, forming the Second Armoured Squadron. The Rolls-Royces were later reorganised into the Third Armoured Squadron after more domestically built armoured cars were brought into service.

== Preservation ==
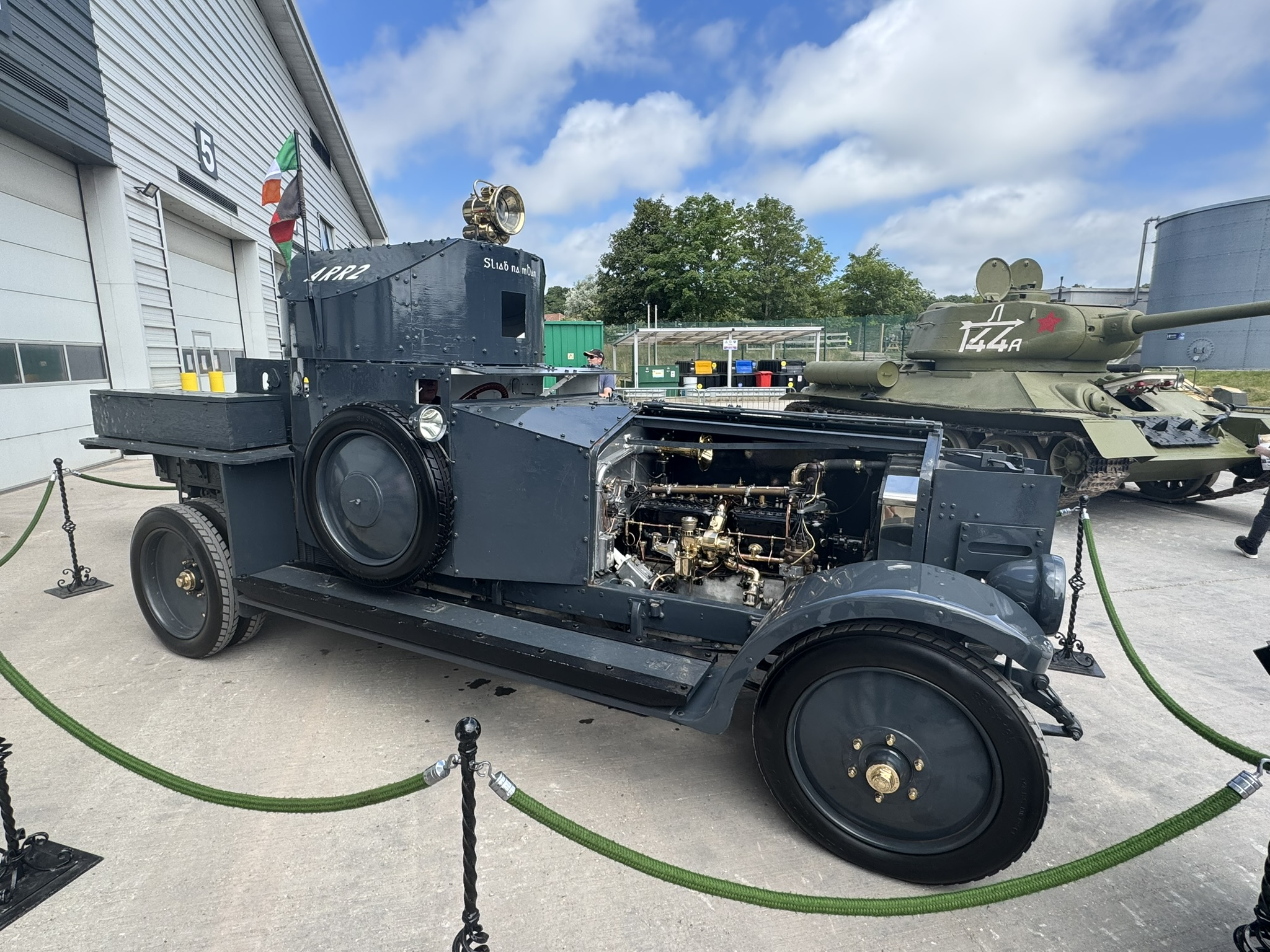
Sliabh na mBan on display at The Tank Museum in 2025

Following the end of hostilities in Europe, the armoured Rolls-Royces were once again retired and stored at the Curragh Camp. It was here that Slievenamon was taken aside by Paddy Lynch, the foreman of the Cavalry Workshop located inside the Camp, who proceeded to carry out an independent preservation of the vehicle.

Lynch had previously served as a driver in the National Army and had been a personal driver of Michael Collins on a number of occasions. In 1924, he joined the Cavalry Workshop where he helped maintain the armoured vehicles. Due to her association with Collins, Lynch wished to preserve Slievenamon in Collins' memory. To disguise what he was doing, Lynch listed the vehicle as scrap metal. Because of this Slievenamon avoided being auctioned off and sold for scrap in 1954. Around this time the vehicle's name was changed to its Gaelic form. (Note: No exact date has been given for when the name change occurred. However, a photo dated to 1960 shows the vehicle with the name Sliabh na mBan painted on its turret.) Lynch continued to maintain Sliabh na mBan until his retirement in 1977, at which point work on the vehicle was handed over to his son Pat.

In 2011, Sliabh na mBan underwent an extensive restoration. The work on the vehicle was carried out by members of the Defence Forces in conjunction with James Black, a vintage car restorator based in Northern Ireland who specialised in restoring the Rolls-Royce Silver Ghost, the model which the Rolls Royce Armoured car was derived from. Pat Lynch's son Padraig, who taken over maintaining the vehicle after his father's retirement, was also involved in the project.
