= Ford Mk V armoured car =

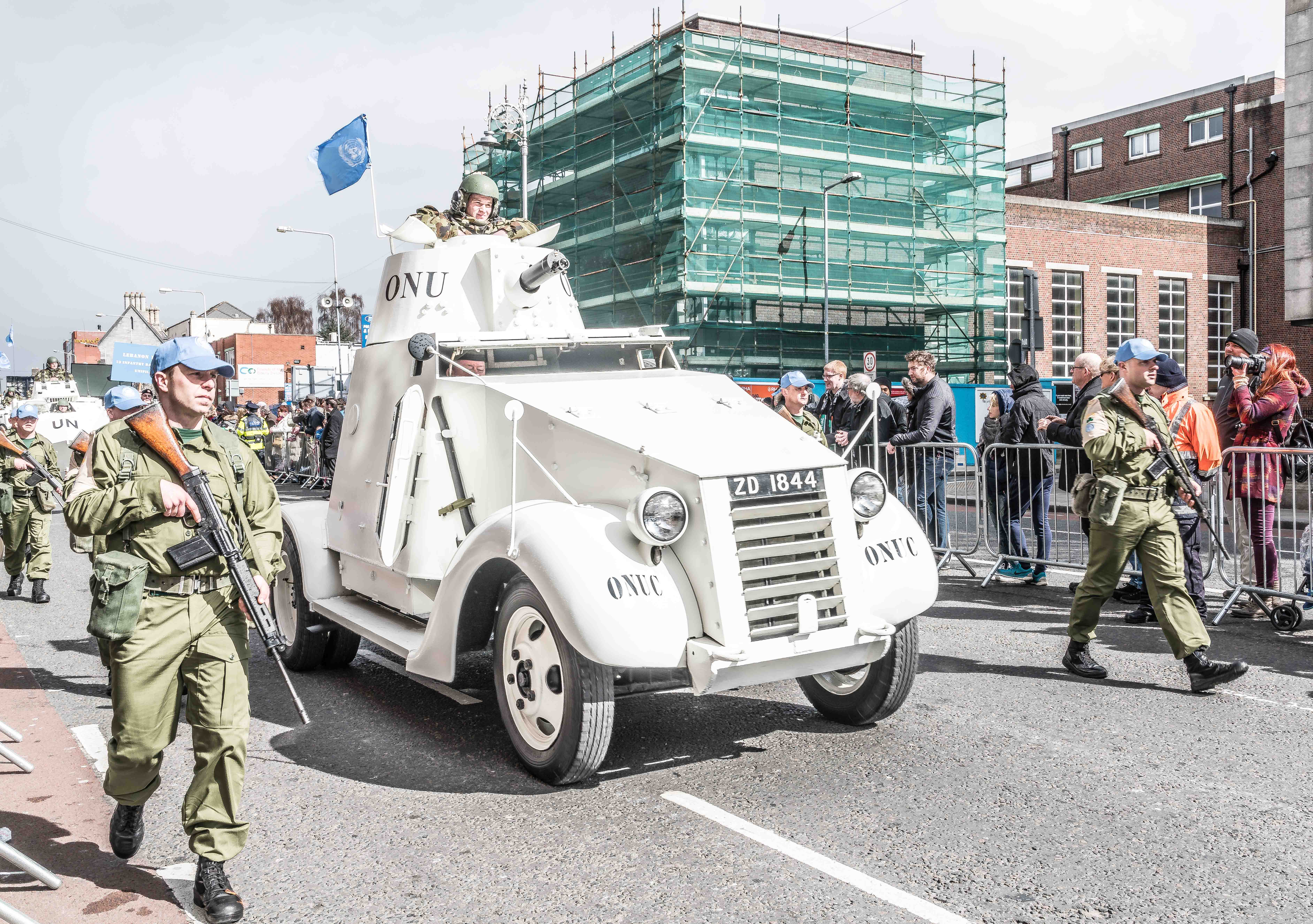
- A renovated Ford Mk VI armoured car, similar and based upon the Ford Mk V, painted in UN colours for a commemorative event in Dublin, 2016
- Type: Armoured car
- Place of origin: Ireland

Production history
- Designed: 1940
- Manufacturer: Thompson & Son, Carlow
- Produced: 1940
- No. built: 14
- Variants: Ford Mk VI (from 1941)

Specifications
- Length: 14 ft 8 inches
- Width: 6 ft 7 inches
- Height: 8 ft 3 inches
- Crew: 3
- Armor: .5 inch
- Main armament: Hotchkiss .303 machine gun
- Engine: 3,621cc Ford V8 petrol 85bhp

The Ford Mk V armoured car was a light armored car, built in Ireland by Thompson & Son of Hanover Works, County Carlow.

== Specifications ==
The Ford Mk V was built with .5 inch mild steel plate, onto a Ford chassis of 122 inches. Fitted with an 85 horsepower petrol Ford V8 3,621 cc engine, the Mark V was much smaller, cheaper to build and had better performance than its predecessor the GSR Ford Mk IV armoured car.

When empty of all unessential equipment, the Mark V weighed just over five tons, and had a max speed of 45 km per hour (28 mph) and a range of 150 km (93 miles). After the prototype was built, inspected and passed, the remaining 13 Ford Mk Vs were built and sold by 1954.

Fourteen were built in total with Peerless armoured car turrets and Hotchkiss .303 machine guns fitted. The vehicles were designed by Maj. J. V. Lawless and Comdt. A. W. Mayne, using ideas taken from the Rolls-Royce armoured car as well as from the Leyland armoured car.

== Variants ==
A later variant, the Ford Mk VI armoured car, was also built by the Thompson company in Carlow. 28 of the Ford Mk VI versions were built, with (unlike the Ford Mk Vs which had Peerless turrets) new turrets, modeled on a Landsverk design, built by the Thompson company themselves
