= Vickers–Peerless armored car =

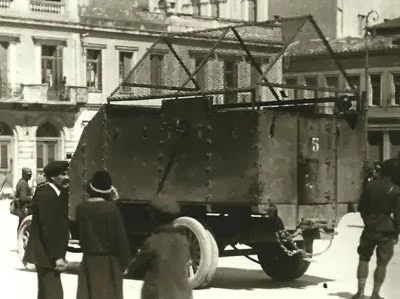
- Vickers–Peerless armored car in Greece (original version)
- Type: Armored truck/troop transport/combat vehicle
- Place of origin: United Kingdom; Kingdom of Greece

Service history
- Used by: Greece
- Wars: World War II; Greco-Italian War

Production history
- Produced: 1923

Specifications
- Crew: 2
- Passengers: 10–15
- Armor: Superstructure: 8 mm Main body: 5.3 mm
- Main armament: 1-3 M1914 Hotchkiss machine guns 10 holes for infantry weapons
- Engine: 1 x 40 hp Peerless inline 40 hp

The Vickers–Peerless armored car was a British and Greek-made armored car model from the 1920s which served in various duties with the Greek police, until it was pressed into emergency military service during World War II.

== Description ==
The Vickers–Peerless armored cars (original version) were built by Vickers in the UK, on the chassis of the 1916 4-ton TC4 4x2, an American truck built by the Peerless company. Like the TC4, the Vickers–Peerless featured a 40 hp inline engine and chain-driven wheels.

The cabin, in the front behind the engine compartment, was crewed by two: a driver and an assistant driver. The rear box could transport a maximum of 15 soldiers to combat or, alternatively, three machine gunners.

For armor, the Vickers–Peerless featured 5.3 mm plates around its main body. The raised troop box in the rear was made from 8 mm of steel. The top was originally left open, but later a fence-like iron roof was added to protect the crew from hand grenades and stones landing inside. This protection still proved insufficient, and so eventually a number of vehicles were modified to a fully armored version in Greece, with roof covered by steel plating. These later steel-plate roofs featured latches around the edges which could be opened or closed for better visibility.

The trucks's main weapons were a number of M1914 Hotchkiss guns, which fired through circular ports in the rear box's armor. Most examples featured at least two machine guns on the left and right side, while some had a third Hotchkiss in the rear, pointing backwards.

Additional armament was provided by holes cut in the armor, similar to the machine gun ports. These holes, however, were left empty and designed for passengers to use with their own weapons.

Built in 1923, the Vickers–Peerless armored cars were the result of a £7,162 contract sent to Vickers by the Greek government, ordering the company to "armor 10 Peerless lorries".

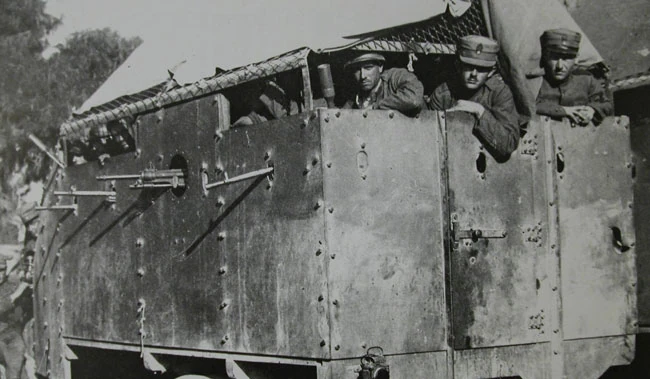
Greek soldiers in the back of a Peerless–Vickers make use of the rifle ports in the sides of the armor.

The vehicles were put into service with the Greek police soon after their completion, where they were used in the Greek civil unrests and coup d'etats of the 1920s and '30s.

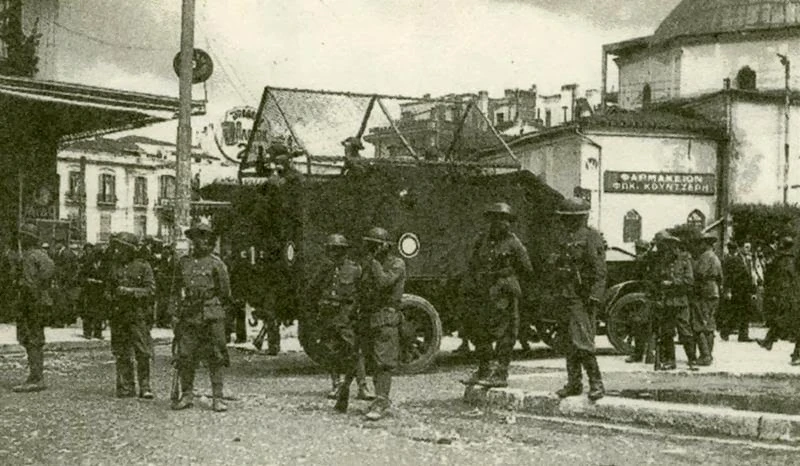
British troops in urban combat, supported by a Peerless–Vickers (original version)

By the time the Greek conflict involved both Germany and Great Britain, at least one of the armored cars was still in service, and supported British troops at Thessaloniki.

It is unknown if any Vickers–Peerless cars survived the war, but none are known to exist today.

== Variants ==
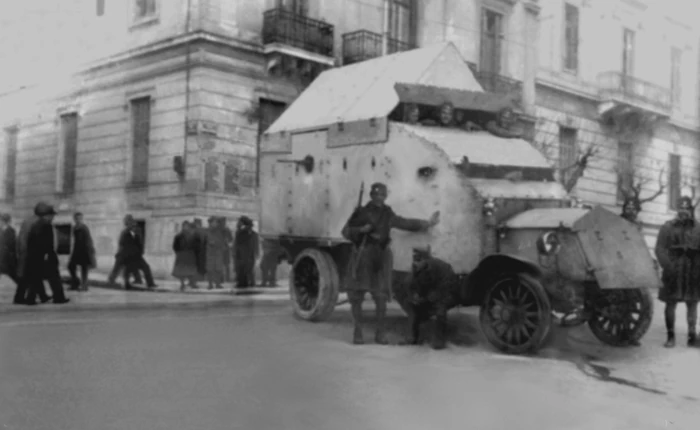
A Vickers–Peerless (fully armored version). Note the latch opened at the front of the vehicle, and the crew inside.

The Vickers–Peerless were very diverse in construction and, as such, many variations exist. The main difference between units was the style of the roof. Most of the vehicles' roofs were iron mesh, but a few were up-armored with steel roofs.

The number of machine guns present was another common variation, numbering anywhere from 1 to 3.

During the Greco-Italian War, the Vickers–Peerless trucks were still in service, and may have seen some scarce use against Italian forces.

=== Technical characteristics ===
- Crew: 2+10/14 men
- Weight: 7.5t
- Engine: 40 hp Peerless inline
- Speed: 40 km/h
- Armor: Superstructure: 8 mm, Main Body: 5.3 mm

== See also ==
- Peerless armoured car
