= List of aircraft of Ireland in World War II =

This is a list of aircraft used by the Irish Air Corps during World War II. During World War II the Irish airforce obtained some aircraft through the confiscation of aircraft that had been forced to land in Ireland.

== Fighters ==
- Gloster Gladiator
- Hawker Hurricane

== Bombers ==
- Fairey Battle-1 confiscated

== Maritime patrol ==
- Supermarine Walrus
- Avro Anson
- Lockheed Hudson-1 confiscated

== Liaison or army cooperation aircraft ==
- Vickers Vespa-Retired June 1940
- Westland Lysander

== See also ==
- List of World War II weapons used in Ireland
