= Dutch Cavalry Museum =

Coordinates: 52.147°N 5.353°E

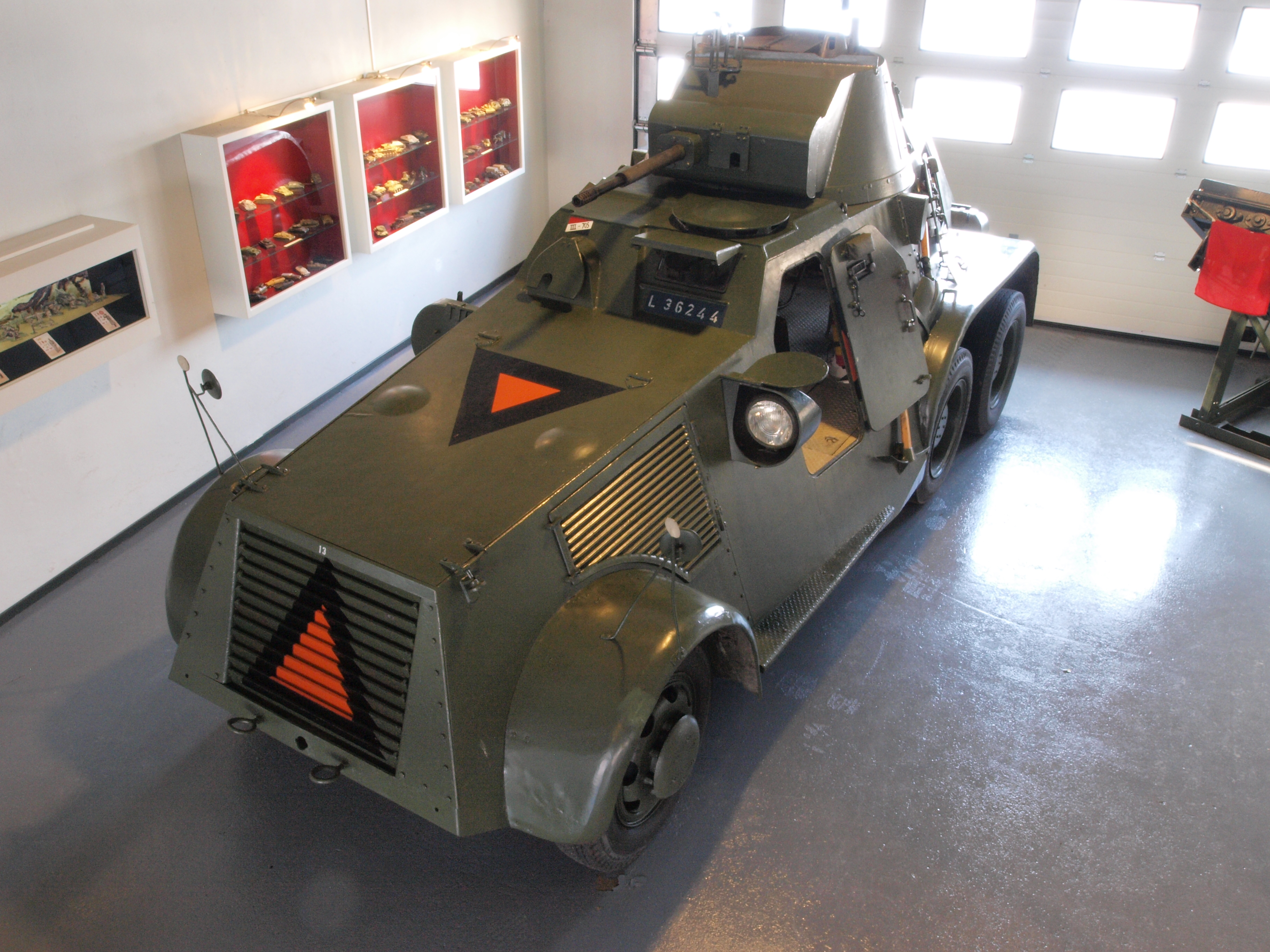
A former Irish Landsverk Landsverk L180 painted to look like a Pantserwagen M-38 in the Cavaleriemuseum Amersfoort

The Dutch Cavalry Museum (Cavalriemuseum) is located in the centre of the Netherlands in the city of Amersfoort. The museum is hosted in two large buildings at the Bernhardkazerne army barracks.

== Collection ==
The collection contains small objects, like uniforms, firearms, silver, paintings, scale models, etc., and larger objects, like vehicles, armoured cars, tanks and related equipment, that were or still are in use with the cavalry of the Royal Dutch Army. The museum covers over 425 years of history, and shows the visitor the evolution of cavalry from horseback to the modern tank.

The museum's collection includes a Goliath Sd.Kfz. 303 tank.
