= Landsverk L-180 =

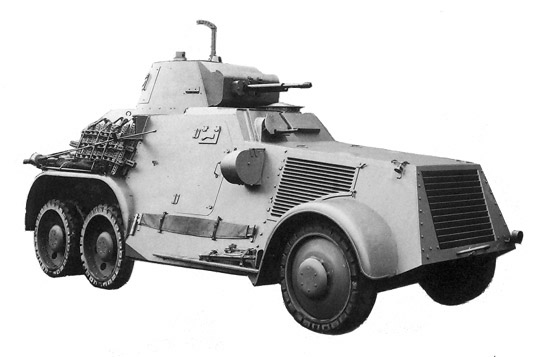
- Landsverk L-180
- Type: Armored car
- Place of origin: Sweden

Service history
- In service: 1933–1980s
- Used by: See operators
- Wars: World War II

Production history
- Designer: AB Landsverk
- Manufacturer: AB Landsverk

Specifications
- Mass: 7,825 kg (17,251 lb)
- Length: 5.86 m (19.2 ft)
- Width: 2.24 m (7 ft 4 in)
- Height: 2.28 m (7 ft 6 in)
- Crew: 5 — commander, driver, gunner, artilleryman and loader
- Armor: 9mm front and sides, 5mm top, 15mm turret
- Main armament: Bofors 37 mm or Madsen 20mm
- Secondary armament: 2 × Madsen 7.7mm
- Engine: Büssing-NAG L8V V8-cylinder petrol (L-180); 180 hp
- Transmission: 3-speed gearbox
- Fuel capacity: 120 liter
- Operational range: 288 km (179 mi)
- Maximum speed: 80 km/h (50 mph)

The Landsverk L-180, L-181 and L-182 are a family of armored cars developed by the Swedish company AB Landsverk during the interwar years. They had a good international reputation for being fast, robust and reliable and were acquired in small numbers by Denmark, Estonia, Ireland and the Netherlands, among others. Their Swedish military designation was Pbil m/41.

== Design ==
The different variants were similarly configured, but were built on different chassis; Büssing-NAG, Mercedes-Benz and Daimler-Benz truck chassis. (See Operators)

=== Armament ===
These vehicles were all similarly armed, most commonly with a Bofors 37 mm or 20 mm Madsen autocannon but ones were also manufactured with other guns. Finland, the only exception, bought one L-182 and armed it with a 13.2 mm L-35/36 machine gun. (See Operators)

=== Engine ===
In the same way, as several different chassis were used, different engines were also used, and where the make of the engine is known, they were manufactured by the same company as the chassis. (See Operators)

== Service ==
- Denmark

Denmark ordered two L-180s in 1935, and they were delivered in 1936. They were used by the Army Technical Corps of the Danish Army under the designation FP-7 and FP-8.

- Estonia

Estonia's only L-180 was acquired in 1937, and it was used by the Tallinn Police.

- Finland

The L-182 was bought for testing in 1936, it was used by the armored unit of the Ratsuväkiprikaati (English: Cavalry Brigade) and saw limited service in the Winter War. Next, the armored unit of 1. Divisioona (English: 1st Division) employed it, in the Continuation War in 1941, already with the original 13.2 mm L-35/36 machine gun replaced by the 20 mm L-39 anti-tank rifle, conversion made approximately in December 1940. It seems that the armored car was out of service in late 1941 and was scrapped in 1945.

- Ireland

Ireland ordered its first two Landsverk L-180s in 1937 and these were delivered the following year. Six more were then ordered and they were delivered in 1939. A further five were ordered but could not be delivered because of the outbreak of World War II, these five were used instead by the Swedish army. Irish Landsverk L-180s were armed with a Madsen 20mm Cannon and two Madsen .303 Machine Guns. The Madsen machine guns were replaced with .30 Browning machine guns in the 1950s and the 20mm cannon was replaced in the 1970s with Hispano-Suiza 20mm cannons taken from former Irish Air Corps De Havilland Vampire jets. In the 1950s the Landsverk's engines were replaced with Lincoln 317 V8 petrol engines developing 155 hp at 3,200rpm. All Irish Landsverks belonged to the 1st Armoured Squadron and used alongside the Irish built Leyland and Dodge armoured cars until they re-equipped with Panhard AML armoured cars in 1972. The Landsverks were then transferred to the reserve FCA units, five going to the 11th Motor Squadron and three to the 3rd Motor Squadron until they were all retired in the 1980s.

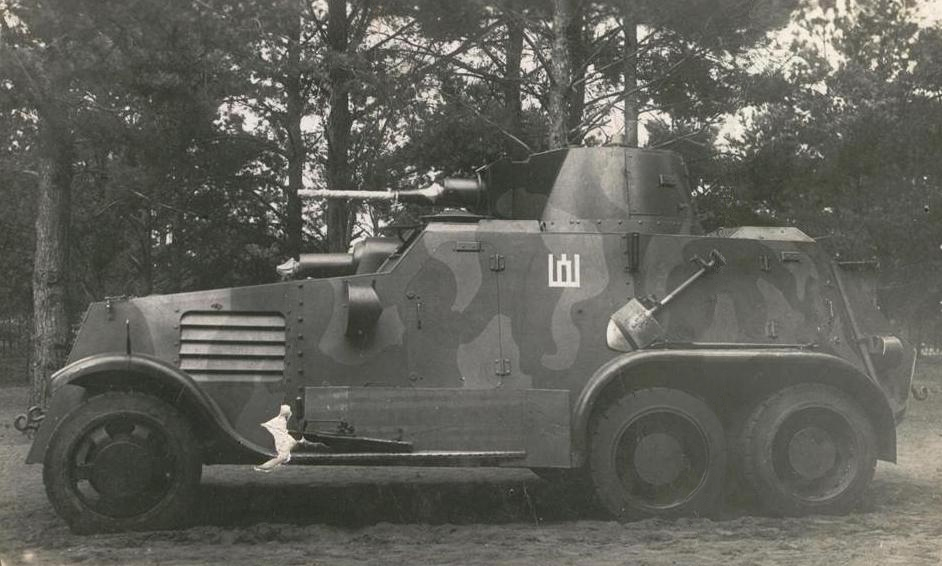
Lithuanian Army L-181

- Lithuania

The Lithuanian Army used the six L-181 ordered in 1933 and delivered in 1934.

- Nazi Germany

The L-180s from the Danish and Dutch armies were captured and used by the German Army for reconnaissance tasks, patrol and training, being called Panzerspähwagen L 202 (h). The Dutch L-181s were also captured and put to service by the Ordnungspolizei for security duties.

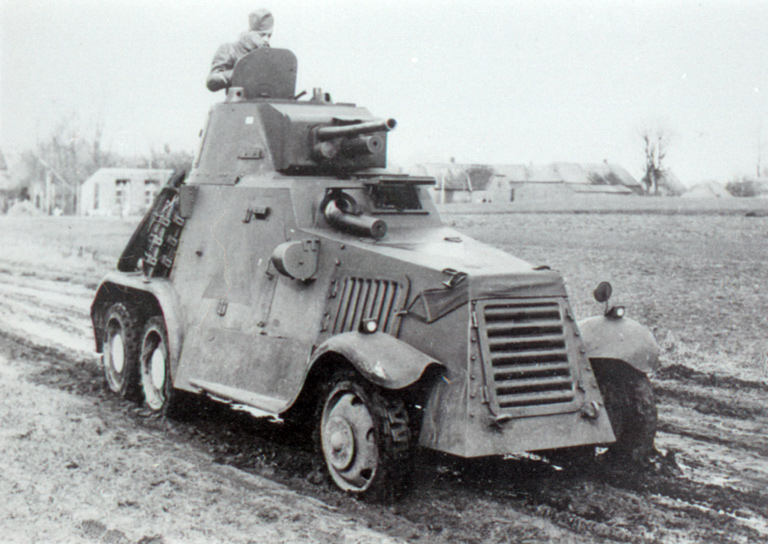
Dutch L-181 (Pantserwagen M.36)

- Netherlands

The Dutch Army bought 13 L-180 in 1938, although it could have been delivered 14 L-180, including two as armored command vehicles without main gun (dummy gun instead). From Landsverk AB were also purchased 12 turrets. The command variant used two special turrets. The command vehicles were used on the two armored squadrons, with one vehicle each. The L-180s were designated Pantserwagen M-38. Netherlands also purchased 12 L-181 and designated them as Pantserwagen M-36.

The Dutch had two squadrons of these Landsverk's operational during the German invasion of the country in May 1940. The 1st squadron [L.181, M.36] with its four platoons of three cars each had been divided over the infantry protection forces of the major air-force bases of Ypenburg, near the Hague, and Schiphol, near Amsterdam. The first six cars at Ypenburg were involved in heavy fighting and contributed considerably to repelling the German airlanding on Ypenburg on 10 May 1940. The 2nd squadron [L-180, M.38] was attached to the Field Army command on the central front of the country. Here they performed a large number of aggressive recce mission during which numerous encounters with German forces of the X.Army Corps occurred. The Dutch operations with the Landsverk's were very successful. Only one was taken out by German countermeasures whereas three were crippled by German bombs or debris on Ypenburg. A number were sabotaged by the Dutch after the capitulation of the Dutch army, but most vehicles were reactivated and serve particularly in the recce battalion of the German 227th Infantry Division in France and later in the former Soviet Union.

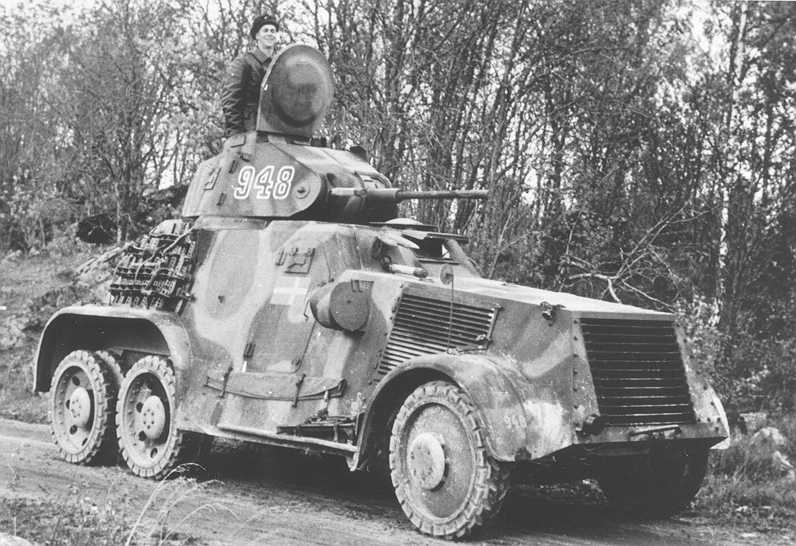
Swedish L-180 (Pbil m/41)

- Sweden

The five L-180 originally ordered by Ireland and not delivered, were used by the Swedish army under the designation Pansarbil m/41 (Pbil m/41). These vehicles had the Swedish-version of Landsverk Lynx turret with the Bofors 20 mm akan m/40 automatic cannon, instead of the Madsen automatic cannon on Irish vehicles or the more common turret armed with a Bofors 37 mm gun.

- Soviet Union

Probably the armored cars from Estonia and Lithuania were captured during the Soviet occupation of 1940.

== Operators ==
Country	Branch	Variant	Quantity	Chassis	Engine	Main armament	Secondary armament	Notes
Denmark	Danish Army	L-180	2	Büssing-NAG	Büssing V8-cyl., 160 HP	Madsen 20mm M 1933 L/60 cannon	2 x Madsen 8 mm M 1924 type C machine guns	
Estonia	Tallinn Police	L-180	1					
Ireland	Irish Army	L-180	8			Madsen 20mm cannon	2 x Madsen .303 machine guns	
Nazi Germany		L-180		Büssing-NAG	Büssing V8-cyl., 160 HP	Madsen 20mm M 1933 L/60 cannon	2 x Madsen 8 mm M 1924 type C machine guns	Captured Danish vehicles
Nazi Germany	Wehrmacht	L-180		Büssing-NAG		Bofors 37 mm gun	3 x 7.92 mm Lewis machine guns	Captured Dutch vehicles
Netherlands	Dutch Army	L-180	13	Büssing-NAG		Bofors 37 mm gun	3 x 7.92 mm Lewis machine guns	12 turrets delivered 14 L-180 delivered
Soviet Union		L-180						Captured Lithuanian vehicles
Sweden	Swedish Army	L-180	5	Büssing-NAG		Bofors 20 mm akan m/40 cannon	2 x Kulspruta m/36 machine guns	Ordered by Ireland but undelivered due to British blockade
Lithuania	Lithuanian Army	L-181	6	Mercedes-Benz	Mercedes-Benz 6-cyl., 65 HP	Oerlikon 20 mm cannon	2 x 7.92 mm Maxim machine guns	
Nazi Germany	Ordnungspolizei	L-181		Daimler-Benz G 3 a/P	Daimler-Benz M09 6-cyl., 80 HP	Bofors 37 mm gun	3 x 7.92 mm Lewis machine guns	Captured Dutch vehicles
Netherlands	Dutch Army	L-181	12	Daimler-Benz G 3 a/P	Daimler-Benz M09 6-cyl. petrol, 80 HP	Bofors 37 mm gun	3 x 7.92 mm Lewis machine guns	
Soviet Union		L-181		Mercedes-Benz	Mercedes-Benz 6-cyl., 65 HP	Oerlikon 20 mm cannon	2 x 7.92 mm Maxim machine guns	Captured Lithuanian vehicles?
Finland	Finnish Army	L-182	1	Daimler-Benz		13.2 mm L-35/36 machine gun 20 mm L-39 anti-tank rifle	2 x 7.92 mm machine guns or 2 x 7.62 mm L-33/36 machine gun and 1 x 7.62 mm Maxim AA machine gun	Crew: 4 (without rear driver) or 5

== Landsverk in Dutch museum ==
The Dutch Cavalry Museum in Amersfoort has a Landsverk L-180 in its collection. It is an original Irish version of the vehicle.

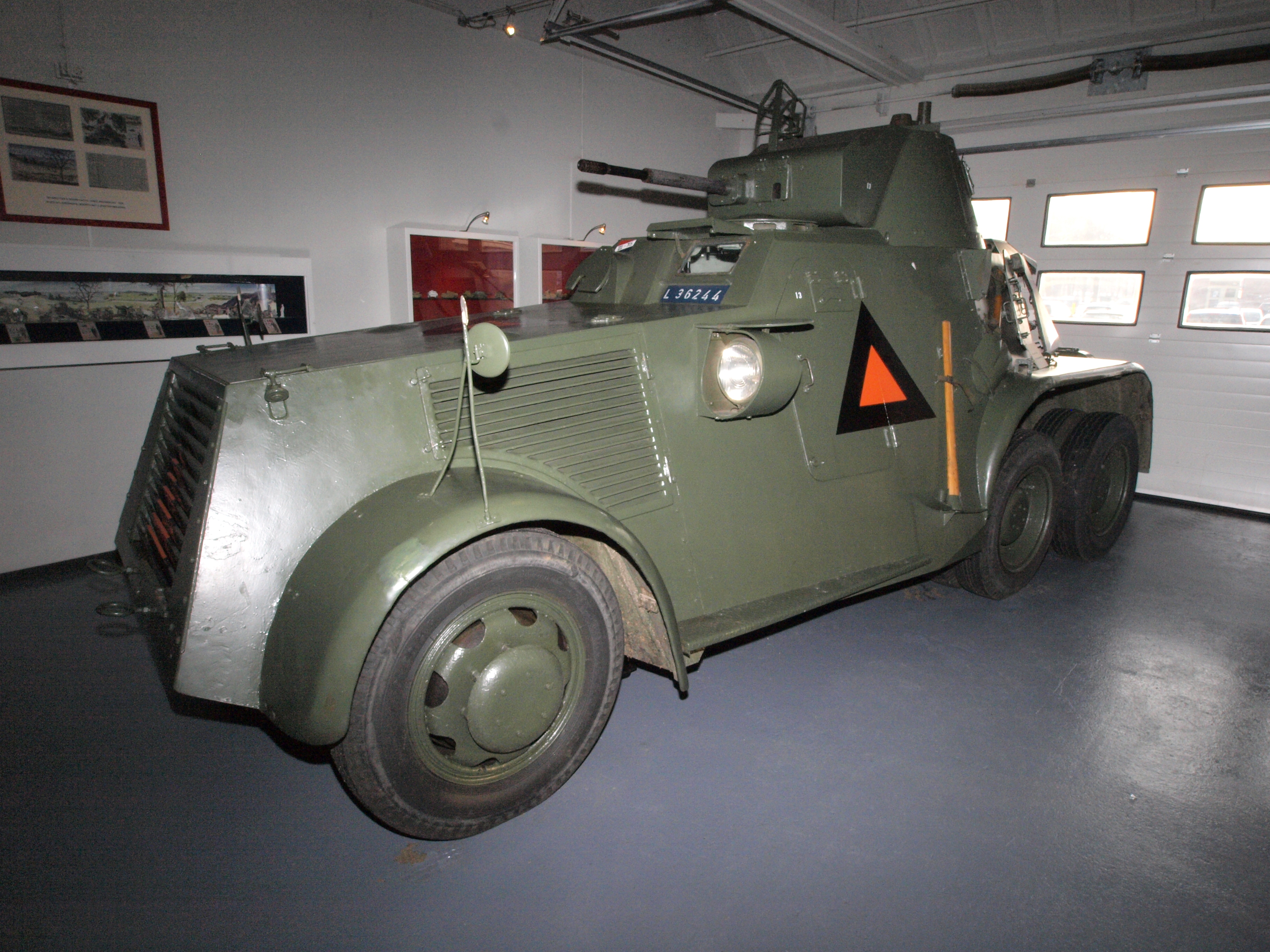
Front view

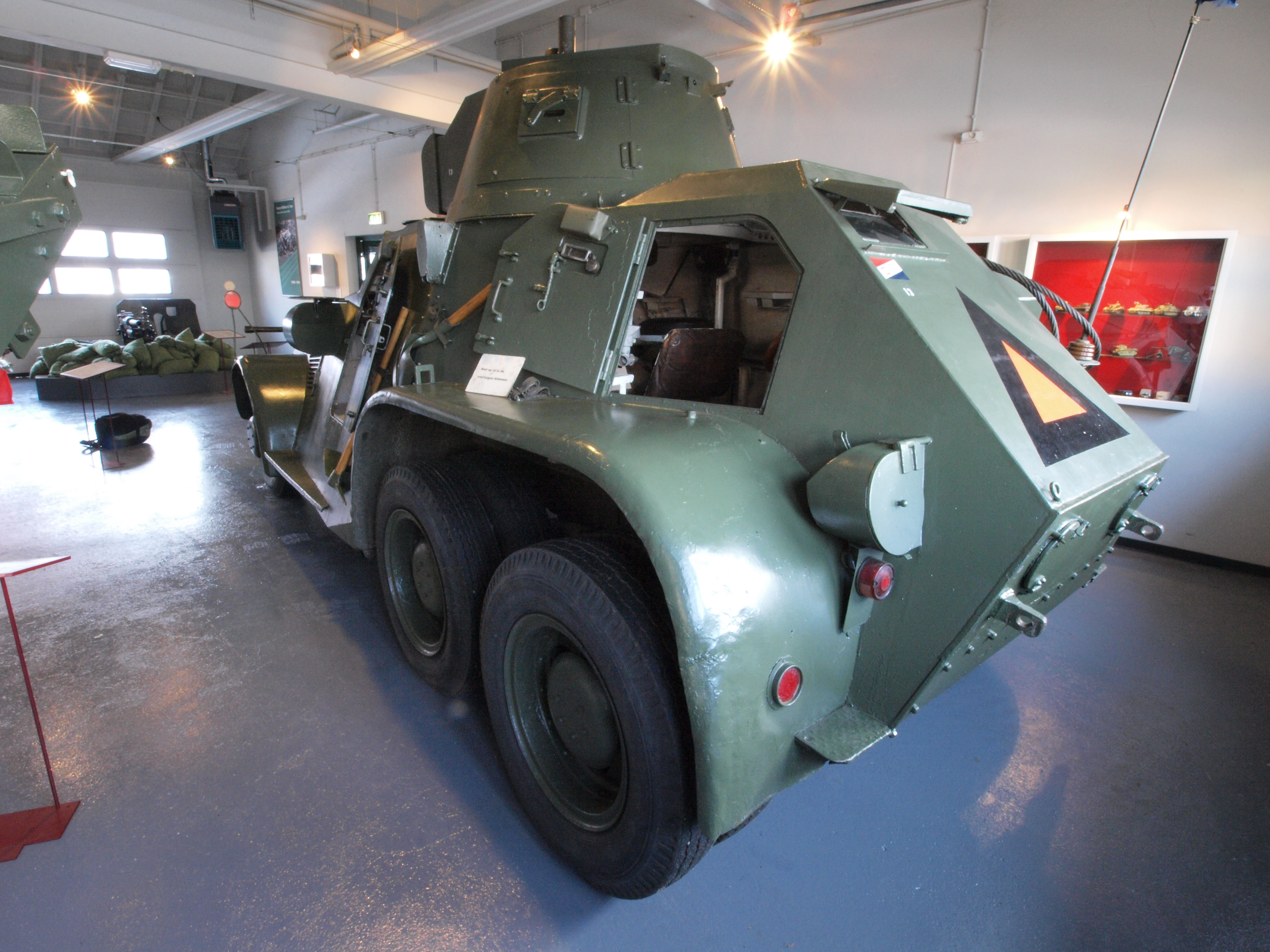
Rear view

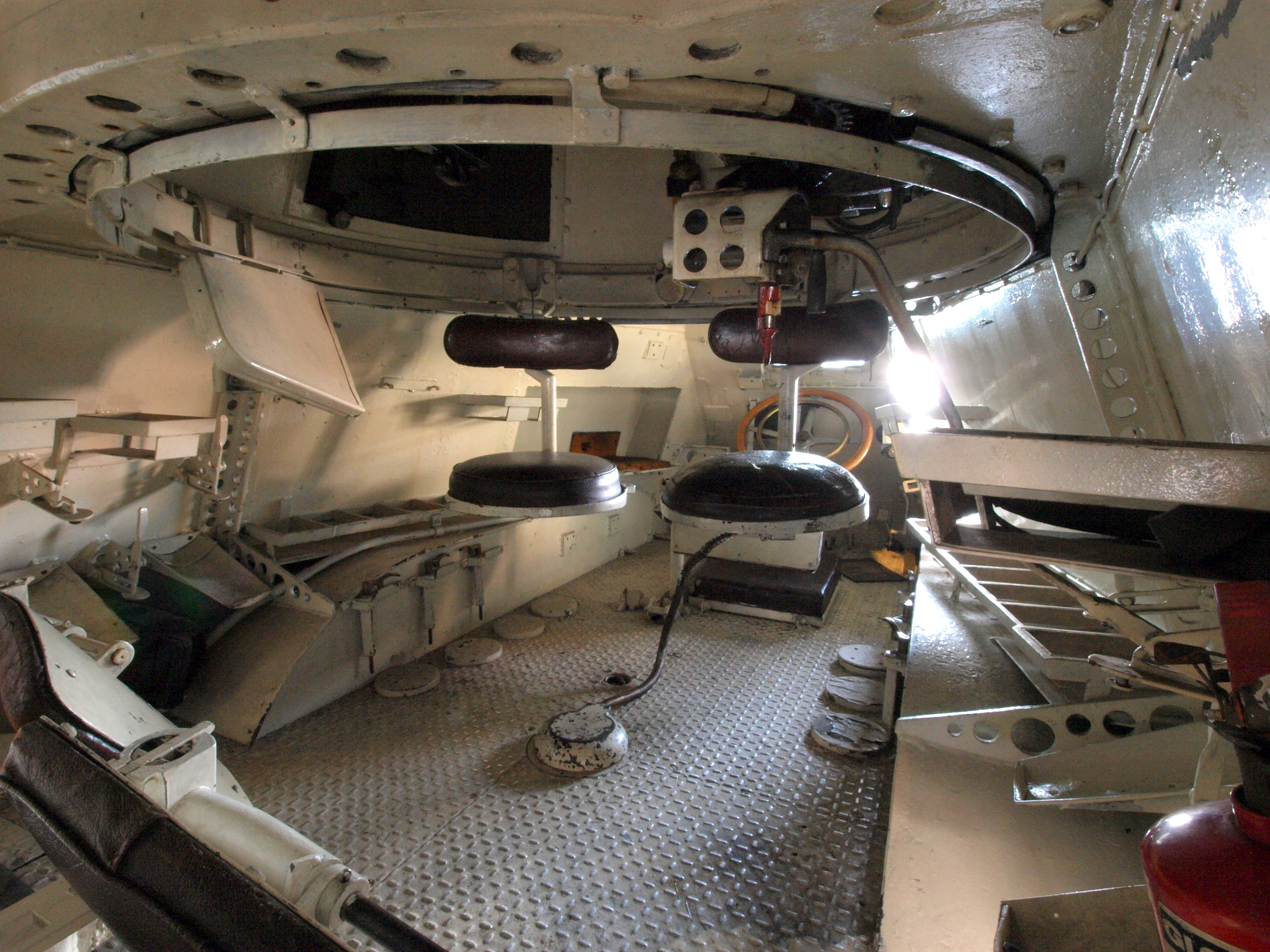
interior view, in front the turret and in the back the steering wheel for the second driver

== See also ==
- Landsverk L-185 — A similar armored car from Landsverk.
