= Peerless armoured car =

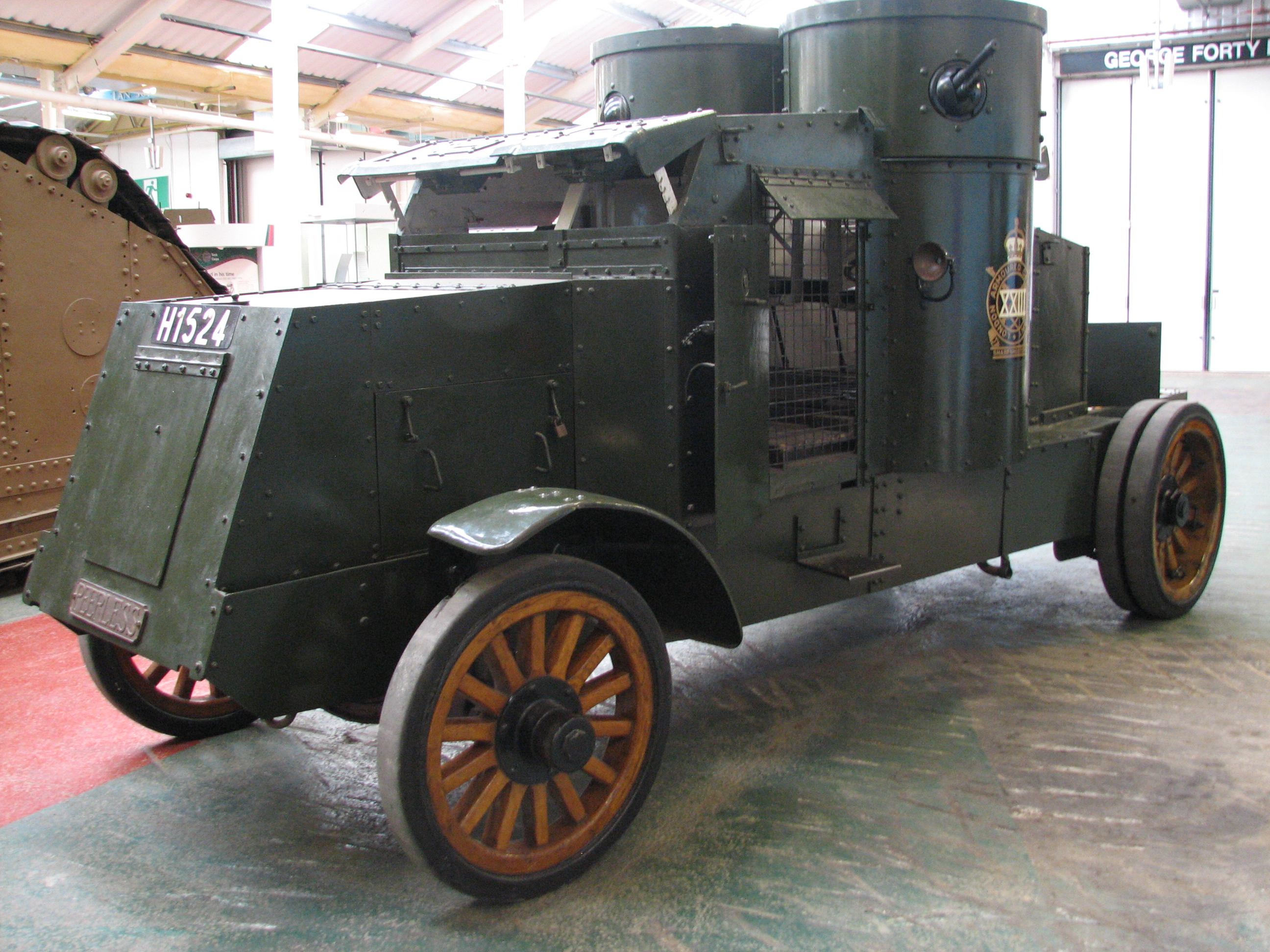
- A Peerless armoured car at The Tank Museum
- Type: Armoured car
- Place of origin: United Kingdom; United States

Service history
- Used by: United Kingdom; Irish Free State / Ireland; Russian Empire
- Wars: World War I; Irish Civil War

Specifications
- Mass: 6.9 t (7.6 short tons; 6.8 long tons)
- Length: 6.12 m (20 ft 1 in)
- Width: 2.23 m (7 ft 4 in)
- Height: 2.77 m (9 ft 1 in)
- Crew: 4
- Armour: 10 mm (0.39 in) maximum
- Main armament: 2 × Hotchkiss 0.303 in (7.7 mm) machine guns
- Secondary armament: None
- Engine: Peerless; 40 bhp (30 kW)
- Power/weight: 5.8 hp/t (4.3 kW/t)
- Operational range: 145 km (90 mi)
- Maximum speed: 25 km/h (16 mph)

During the First World War, sixteen American Peerless trucks were modified by the British to serve as armoured cars. These were relatively primitive designs with open backs, armed with a Pom-pom gun and a machine gun, and were delivered to the British Army in 1915. They were used also by the Imperial Russian Army as self-propelled anti-aircraft guns.

After the war, a new design was needed to replace armoured cars that had been worn out. As a result, the Peerless armoured car design was developed in 1919. It was based on the chassis of the Peerless three-tonne lorry, with an armoured body built by the Austin Motor Company.

The Peerless lorry was a relatively slow and heavy vehicle but was reckoned to be tough, with solid rubber tyres and rear-wheel chain drive. The armour for the vehicle produced by the Austin company was based on an earlier design created for the Russian Army, which had been used in very limited numbers at the end of the war in France. The original Austin design, however, was shorter than the Peerless and the resulting combination was awkward and difficult to steer in confined spaces. In order to reduce the problem, a duplicate set of driving controls was installed at the rear of the vehicle.

The most common variant was a twin-turret design fitted with two machine guns. However, a number of other variants were developed, including a vehicle armed with a 3-inch (76 mm) gun and an anti-aircraft variant armed with a 13-pound 6cwt AA gun.

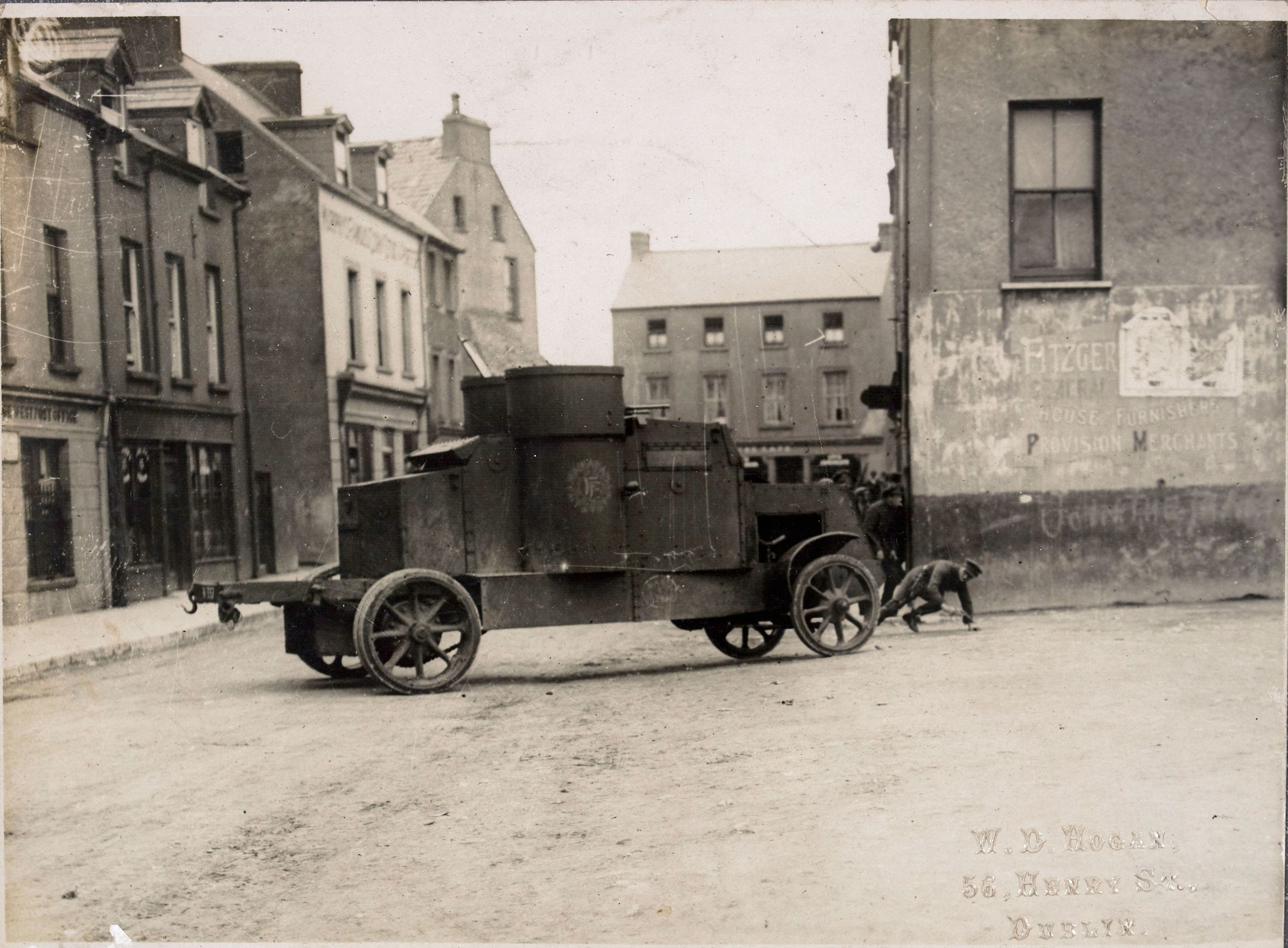
A Peerless armoured car in action in an urban setting, in Passage West, County Cork, during the Irish Civil War, 1922

Poor off-road performance hampered the vehicle but it still saw considerable service, notably in Ireland. A few were still in service with the British at the start of the Second World War. Seven were in service with the Irish National Army during the Irish Civil War and used by the Irish Defence Forces up until 1932. The type was not popular in Irish service. One was taken to Cork City on board the TSS Arvonia as part of the sea-borne landing force but took a long time to unload. The car was reliable, but slow, heavy, unstable, and unsuitable for poor roads - effectively meaning that its deployment by the Irish military was almost exclusively restricted to urban areas. In 1935, four Irish Peerless armoured hulls were mounted on modified Leyland Terrier 6x4 chassis. A year later their twin turrets were replaced by a single Landsverk L60 tank turret. This new vehicle was known as the Leyland armoured car and remained in Irish service until the early 1980s. The 14 old Irish Peerless turrets with their Hotchkiss machine guns were fitted in 1940 to 14 Irish-built vehicles and designated the Ford Mk V armoured car.

== See also ==
- Rolls-Royce armoured car
- Vickers-Peerless armored car
