= 62 Reserve Cavalry Squadron =

62nd Reserve Cavalry Squadron
- Unit Flash of the 62nd Res. Cav. Sqn.
- Active: 1 October 2005
- Country: Ireland
- Branch: Army
- Type: Cavalry Squadron
- Role: Reconnaissance/Combat Support
- Size: Squadron
- Part of: 2nd Reserve Eastern Brigade
- Garrison/HQ: Cathal Brugha Barracks
- Mottos: Through the mud and the blood to the green fields beyond
- Colors: Black, Red, Green

The 62nd Reserve Cavalry Squadron was an armoured unit in the Irish Reserve Defence Forces (RDF). It was formed from the former 11th Cavalry Squadron FCÁ in October 2005. In 2013 with the reorganisation of the Reserve Defence Forces it became part of the 2nd Cavalry Squadron its Permanent Defence Force parent unit.

== History ==
=== The Emergency ===
The unit's roots start during The Emergency. During World War II, Ireland adopted a stance of strict neutrality, and contingency plans were made to defend the state from enemies from abroad, supported mainly by volunteer "reservists." A cyclist squadron was formed in March 1942, part of the Corps in the North Dublin area. On 14 May 1942, the 41st Cyclist Squadron was established, made up of active cyclists from Dublin clubs, and training began in the McKee Barracks. Thus, the embryonic 11th Cyclist Regiment L.D.F was born, with the 42nd (An Óige) Cyclist Squadron following shortly afterwards, and the 43rd Cyclist Squadron after that. The Guidgon of the latter included a Pegasus, which was incorporated into the 11th Cavalry (FCÁ) Regimental Guidgon after the Emergency.

The next Squadron was the 44th (an Irish speaking unit), and the formation of a Headquarters brought the Regiment to full strength. On 15 October 1944, the Guidgons were formally presented to the Regiment. These units were not involved directly in the conflict in Europe, and when "The Emergency" ended, the raison d’être for the L.D.F ceased. However, there was recognition of the need for a reserve force, and so all members of the L.D.F were given the option of forming the new Fórsa Cosanta Áitiúil (F.C.Á) in 1946.

=== Post World War II ===
In 1948 the 11th Cavalry Regiment was activated in Dublin, the only armoured unit of its size in the FCA or PDF. The new regiment was equipped with Ford Mark VI armoured cars and a squadron was raised from students at Bolton Street College of Technology. In 1959, the unit was redesignated the 11th Motor Squadron. Between 1972 and 1987 the unit (renamed the 11th Cavalry Squadron in 1983) was equipped with Landsverk and Leyland armoured cars retired from PDF service. The squadron featured in the 1987 documentary A Cast of Thousands.

Into the new millennium, the 11th Cavalry Squadron developed more intensive training programs and a broader range of courses. Those programs and courses consisted of armoured car shoots conducted at least twice a year and FCÁ personnel taking part on the same gunnery shoot as their PDF counterparts.

As part of a wider restructure of the defence forces, (which began in 2000), the 11th Cavalry Squadron FCÁ was stood down in October 2005 and the new 62nd Reserve Cavalry Squadron RDF took up the mantel.
