= Leyland armoured car =

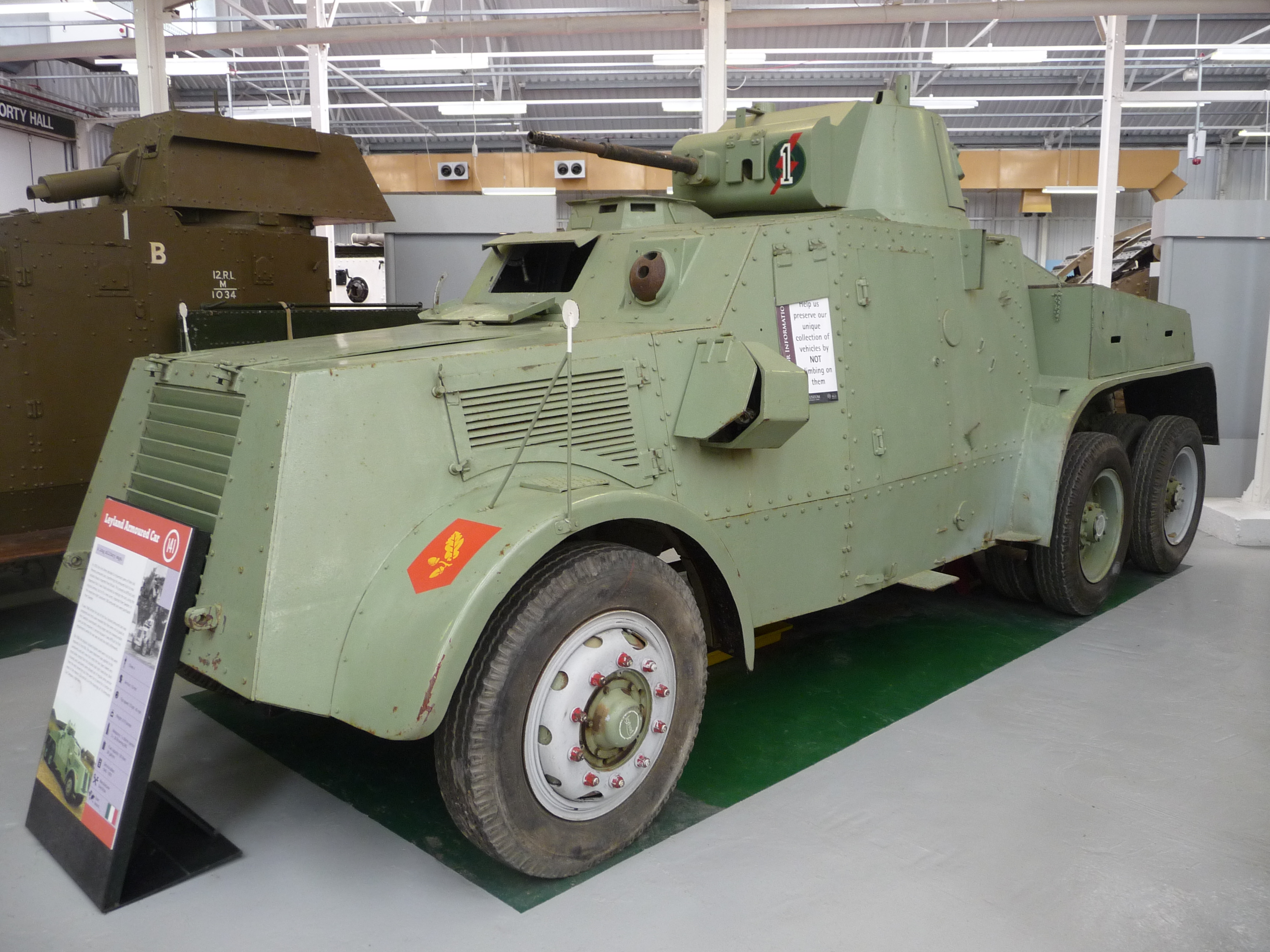
- Leyland armoured car at Bovington Tank Museum
- Type: Armoured car
- Place of origin: Ireland

Service history
- In service: 1935–1980s

Production history
- Designed: 1934
- Produced: 1934–1940
- No. built: 4

Specifications
- Mass: 8 tons 15 cwt laden
- Length: 20 ft 11 inches (6.13 m)
- Width: 7 ft 3 inches (2.26 m)
- Height: 8 ft
- Crew: 4
- Armour: 13 mm maximum
- Main armament: Madsen 20 mm
- Secondary armament: 0.303 in Madsen machine gun, from 1958 two .30 in Browning machine guns
- Engine: 6-cylinder Leyland Terrier petrol from 1958 5,195 cc Ford V8 type 317 petrol 33 hp 62–80 bhp from 1958 155 hp at 3,200 rpm
- Transmission: 4 speeds plus reverse × 2 speed auxiliary driving rear wheels
- Suspension: 6 × 4 wheeled
- Operational range: 150 miles
- Maximum speed: 45 mph (72 km/h) with Ford V8

Leyland armoured car refers to four armoured cars, built between 1934 and 1940, which were used by the Irish Army. The first Leyland armoured car was built in 1934, and three more were built by 1940. The Leylands served with the Irish Army until 1972, and with the reserve An Fórsa Cosanta Áitiúil (FCA) until the early 1980s.

== History ==
The Leyland armoured car was based on a 6×4 Leyland Terrier lorry chassis. The first chassis was purchased from Ashenhurst of Dublin in 1934 and an armoured hull was built and fitted using armour and turrets from an obsolete Peerless armoured car. The new vehicle was tested and it was recommended that the twin Peerless turrets be replaced with a single turret. In 1935, three more Leyland Terrier chassis were bought and the Swedish Landsverk L60 tank turret was selected in 1936 to replace the twin Peerless turrets, however it was not until 1939 that all four Leyland armoured cars were finished. The armament of the Leylands was a Madsen 20mm cannon and a .303 Madsen machine gun.

The Leylands entered service with the 1st Armoured Squadron alongside the Landsverk L180 and Irish built Dodge armoured cars. They were then set up as A Troop of the 2nd Motor Squadron until recombined with the L180s in 1942.

In 1958, the Leyland's front hull was modified and the engine replaced with Ford V-8s. .30 Browning machine guns replaced the Madsen machine guns, and another Browning was fitted in the hull next to the driver.

One Leyland was scrapped in the 1960s. In 1972, the 1st Armoured Squadron was re-equipped with Panhard AML armoured cars and the three surviving Leylands joined the reserve Forsea Cosanta Aituil 5th Motor Squadron until they were also equipped with Panhard AMLs in the early 1980s. One of these was also owned by the 4th Cavalry squadron in Longford in the years 1979 to some time in the early eighties, although it did not see service and was more a museum piece

The Bovington Tank Museum gained their example through an exchange for a Ferret armoured car.
