= Alexander Bjarnov =

Personal details
- Born: July 7, 1838 Copenhagen, Denmark
- Died: July 31, 1912 (aged 74) Copenhagen, Denmark

Julius Alexander Nicolaj Rasmussen Bjarnov (1838–1912) was a Danish gunsmith and inventor.

== Biography ==
Bjarnov attended school in Viborg and subsequently completed his training in Aarhus. In 1864, he was hired as a mechanic at the Royal Danish Arsenal.

In the 1880s, Bjarnov collaborated with Herman Madsen to develop a one of the first semi-automatic rifles, the prototype Forsøgsrekylgevær M1888. Completed in 1887, the Forsøgsrekylgevær (lit. ''experimental recoil [operated] rifle'') was rejected after tests proved it excessively heavy and too complicated for the average soldier to operate. The unique recoil system used in the rifle later provided the basis for the successful Madsen machine gun.

Bjarnov is credited with introducing cost-effective serial production to the Arsenal. He was involved in the production of the Danish version of the Krag–Jørgensen rifle, which entered service as the Gevær M1889. Bjarnov visited America several times and once met Thomas Edison.

Bjarnov's surname was originally Rasmussen. A Russophile, he adopted the pseudo-Russian name "Bjarnov" in 1902. After retiring in 1908, Bjarnov traveled to Russia and was responsible for introducing semi-automatic rifle technology to the Imperial Russian Army. He died in 1912.
