= Thorvald Madsen =

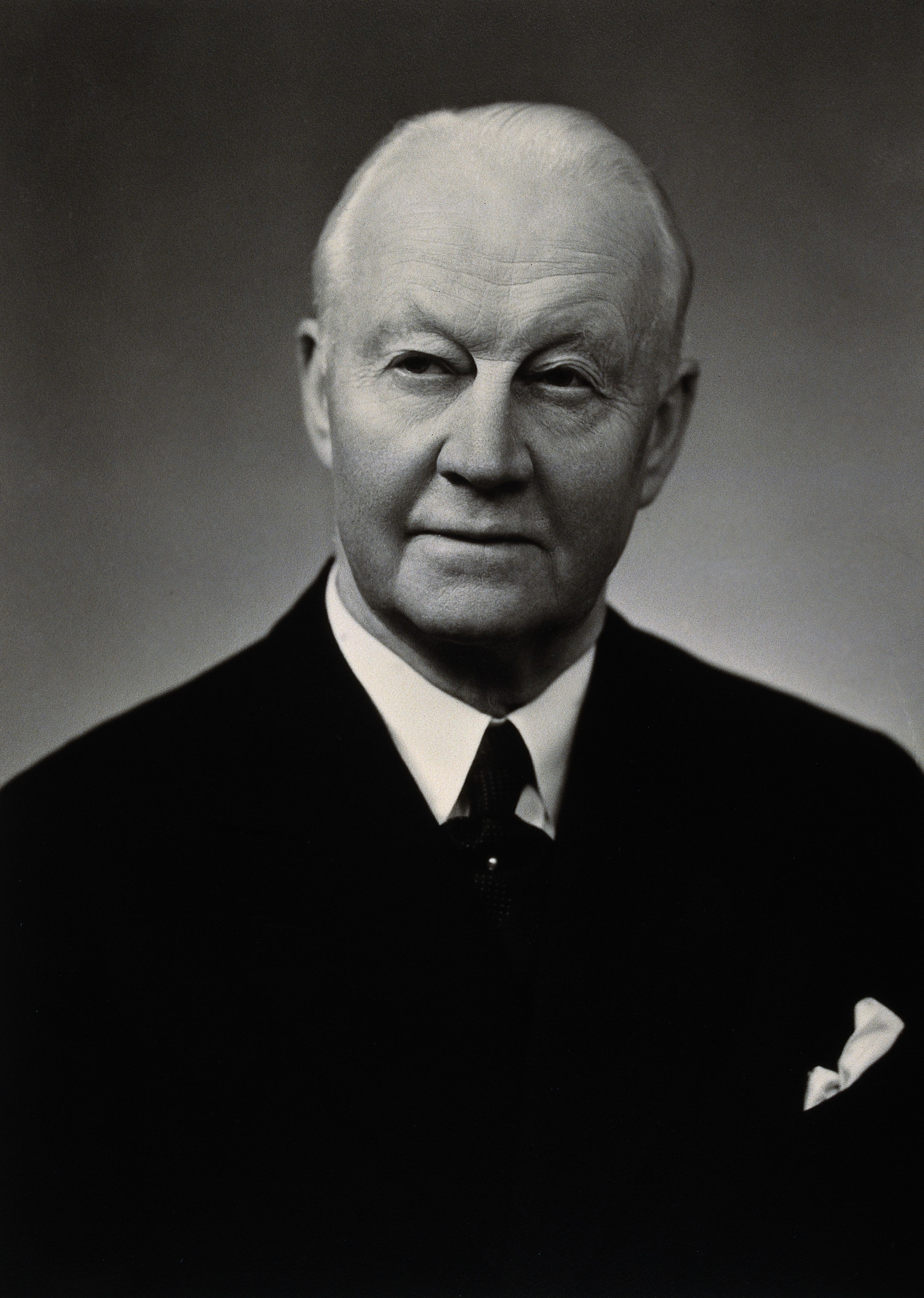
- Born: February 18, 1870; Frederiksberg
- Died: April 14, 1957 (aged 87); Gjorslev
- Awards: Buchanan Medal (1932)
- Scientific career
- Fields: Bacteriology
- Workplaces: Statens Serum Institut

Thorvald John Marius Madsen (February 18, 1870 in Frederiksberg – April 14, 1957 in Gjorslev) was a Danish physician and bacteriologist. Madsen was the director of Statens Serum Institut from 1910 to 1940.

He was the son of General V. H. O. Madsen.

During World War I, Thorvald Madsen in his capacity as director of Statens Serum Institut was heavily involved in humanitarian work for prisoners of war. From 1916 onwards Madsen did several inspection visits to detention centers in Russia, where conditions were highly questionable. During these travels brought Thorvald Madsen, among other things excess serum against various diseases. In addition, Madsen helped more Danish-Schleswigers, who had been in German military service and ended up a prisoner of war. Thorvald Madsen was also involved in the work of selecting sick prisoners of war who were sent to Denmark as part of the conditions of prisoner exchanges between, on the one hand, Austria-Hungary and Germany on the other hand, Russia.

In the years 1921-1937 was Thorvald Madsen, president of the League of Nations Health Committee. The current WHO relies heavily on the Health Commission's work.

Madsen was Knight of the Dannebrog in 1902, Dannebrogsmand 1918, the Commander of the 2nd degree in 1920, of 1 degree in 1927 and received the Grand Cross 1937.

He is buried in Garrison Cemetery.

== Sources ==
- Iris Borowy & Anne Hardy, Of medicine and men: biographies and ideas in European social medicine between the World Wars, P. Lang, 2008.
- Article "Thorvald Madsen" pp. 179–185 in Dansk Biografisk Leksikon, 2nd ed., vol. 15, 1938
