= Madsen machine gun =

Danish light machine gun

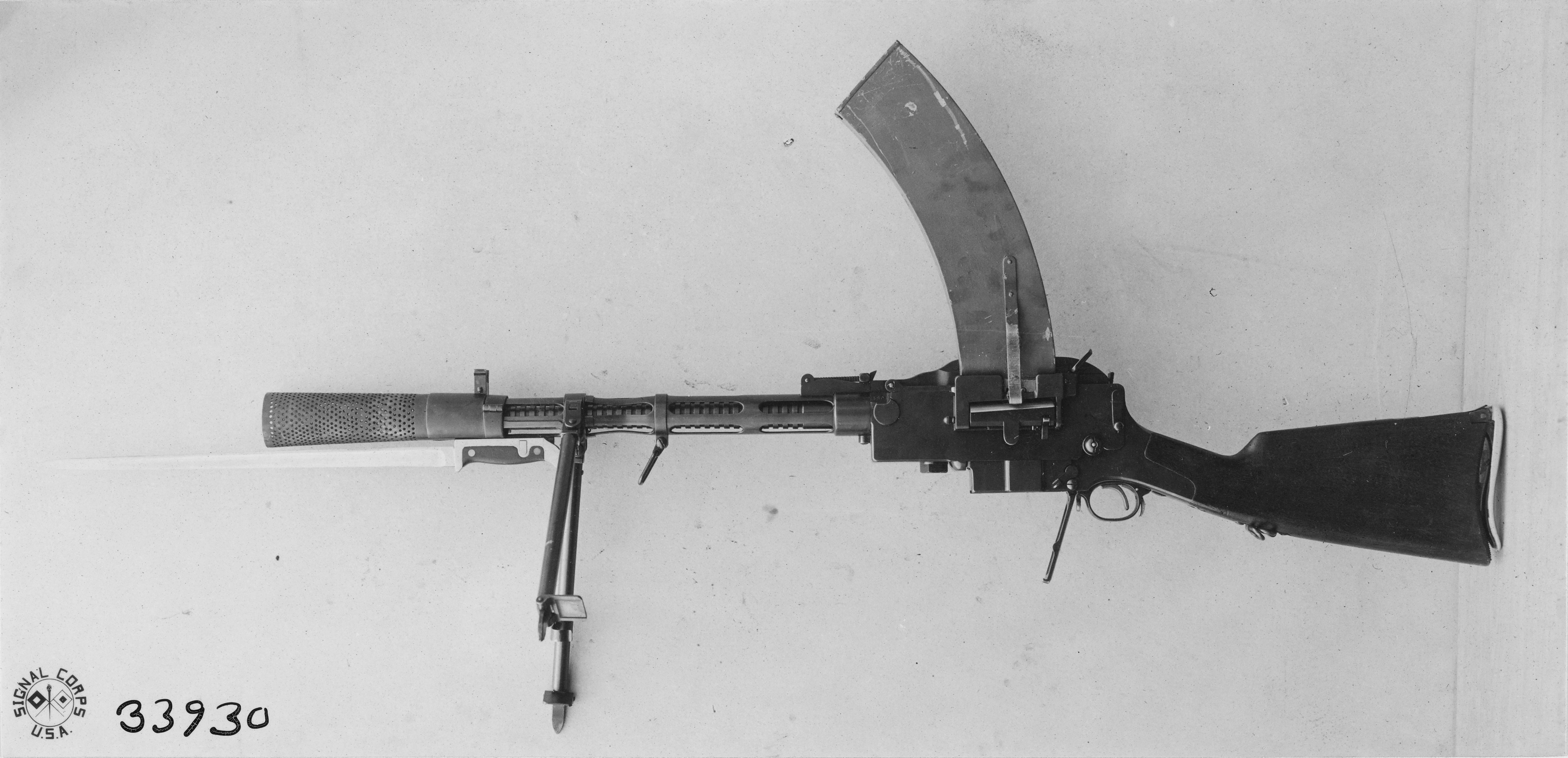
- A Madsen light machine gun
- Type: Light machine gun
- Place of origin: Denmark

Service history
- In service: 1902–present
- Used by: See § Users
- Wars: List of conflicts: Russo-Japanese War; Bambatha Rebellion; 1911 Revolution; World War I; Russian Civil War; Mexican Revolution; Finnish Civil War; Warlord Era; Rif War; Constitutionalist Revolution; Chaco War; Spanish Civil War; World War II; Indonesian National Revolution; Portuguese Colonial War; Football War; Salvadoran Civil War; Militias-Comando Vermelho conflict

Production history
- Designer: Alexander Bjarnov; Theodor Schouboe
- Designed: 1896-1902
- Manufacturer: Dansk Rekyl Riffel Syndikat A/S; Rexer Arms Company; Guangdong Arsenal
- Produced: 1902–1955

Specifications
- Mass: 9.07 kg (20.00 lb)
- Length: 1,143 mm (45.00 in)
- Barrel length: 584 mm (22.99 in)
- Cartridge: List of cartridges: .30-06 Springfield; .303 British; 6.5×52mm Carcano; 6.5×53.5mmR; 6.5×55mm; 7×57mm Mauser; 7.62×51mm NATO; 7.62×54mmR; 7.65×53mm Mauser; 7.9×57mm I; 7.92×57mm Mauser; 8×50mmR Lebel; 8×50mmR Mannlicher; 8×58mmR Danish Krag
- Action: Mixed recoil-operated tilting block
- Rate of fire: 450 rounds/min
- Muzzle velocity: 870 m/s (2,854 ft/s) (6.5×55mm)
- Feed system: 25-round detachable single-row box magazine; 30 and 40-round detachable double-row box magazine; 80-round drum magazine; Belt-fed
- Sights: Rear V-notch and front post

The Madsen is a light machine gun that Alexander Bjarnov and Theodor Schouboe designed and proposed for adoption by Colonel Vilhelm Herman Oluf Madsen, the Danish Minister of War, and that the Royal Danish Army adopted in 1902. It was the world's first true light machine gun produced in quantity and Madsen was able to sell it in 12 calibres to over 34 countries. The gun saw extensive combat usage for over 100 years, with continued use in limited quantities worldwide into the modern day. The Madsen was primarily produced by Compagnie Madsen A/S (later operating as Dansk Rekyl Riffel Syndikat A/S and then Dansk Industri Syndikat A/S).

== Design details ==
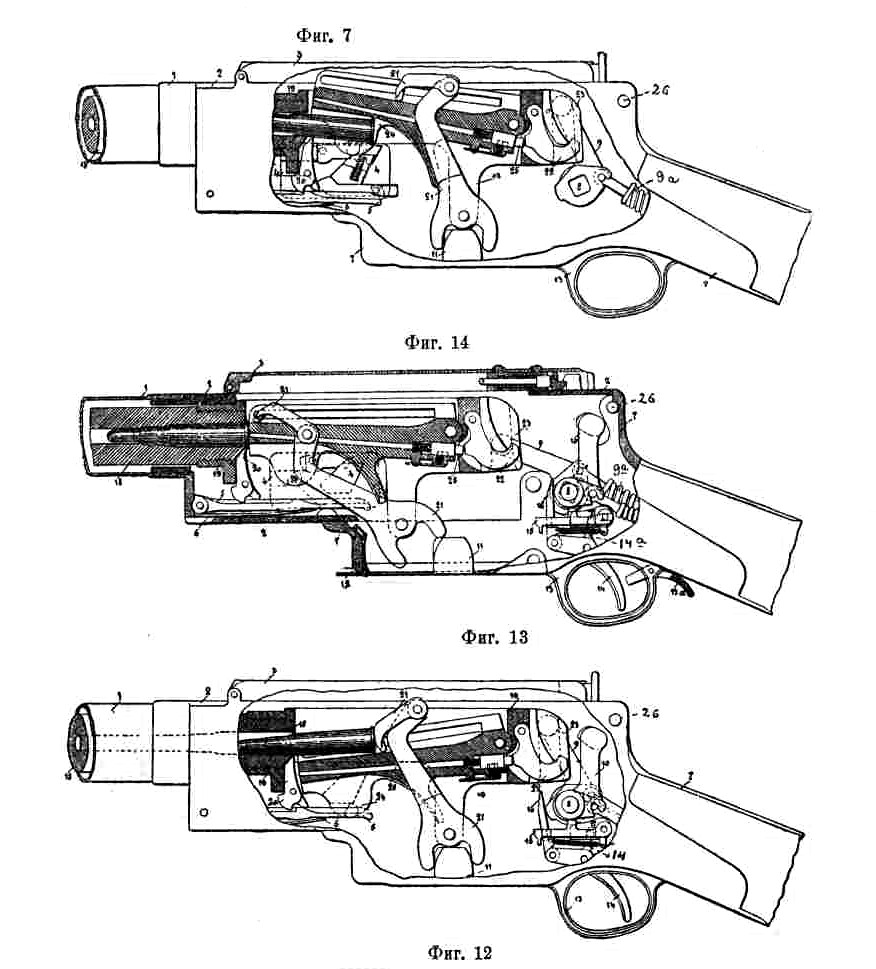
Operating cycle of the Madsen

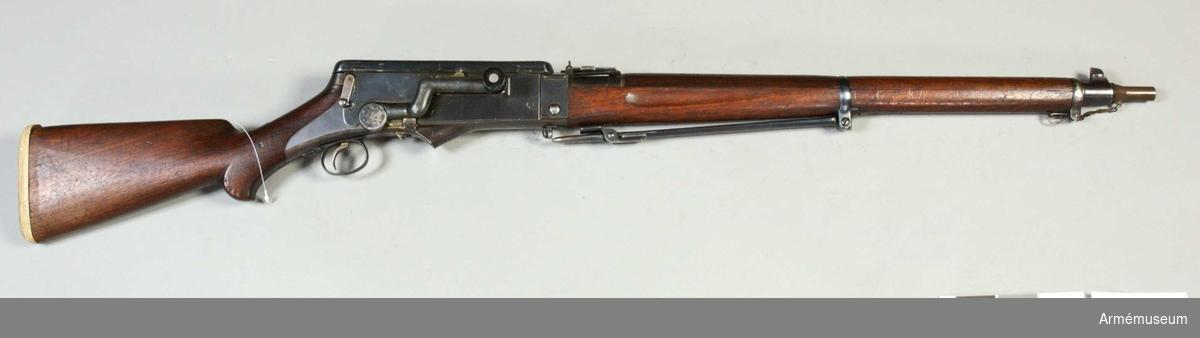
Madsen M1896 Flaadens Rekylgevær (Armémuseum).jpg

The design dates to the 1880s, with the Danish Self Loading rifle M.1888 (Forsøgsrekylgevær; lit. 'trial recoil rifle'), being a precursor design. In 1883 Captain Vilhelm Herman Oluf Madsen (a Danish artillery officer), and Rustmester Alexander Bjarnov (a weapons technician at the Danish Arsenal), began working on a recoil-operated self-loading rifle; Madsen developed the idea and Rasmussen fabricated the actual weapons. The rifle used a non-removable stripper clip that used gravity to feed rounds to the action; when the gun was not in use one could fold the clip down to cover the opening. The rifle used the 8×58RD cartridge, first in black-powder and then in a much more powerful smokeless powder version. The design was not successful. An improved design in 1896 gave the rifle an enclosed, but still gravity-fed, magazine. This version saw some 50–60 rifles being produced, but they were only issued to the Danish navy for use by coastal fortifications troops.

Investors formed a company (the Dansk Riffel Syndikat; DRS), in 1898 to commercialise the rifle, and bought the patent rights from Madsen and Rasmussen in exchange for royalties on future production. By this time Madsen had left the project to become Minister of War in Denmark. In 1899 Lieutenant Jens Schouboe became the manager for the DRS, and a number of subsequent patents bear his name. Consequently, the Madsen rifle is sometimes referred to as the Schouboe rifle. In 1901 he patented the design for the Madsen machine gun. The original Madsen machine guns used black-powder cartridges that quickly jammed the action. However, once the design was tried with 6.5mm smokeless powder rounds it worked well.

The Madsen has a rather sophisticated and unique operating cycle. The machine gun uses a mixed recoil-operated locking system with a hinged bolt that is patterned after the lever-action Peabody Martini breechblock. The recoil operation is part short and part long recoil. After firing a round to start the open bolt firing cycle, the initial recoil impulse drives the barrel, barrel extension, and bolt to the rear. A pin on the right side of the bolt moves backward in grooves in an operating cam plate mounted to the right side of the receiver. After 12.7 mm (0.5 in) of travel, the bolt is cammed upward, away from the breech (the "short" portion of the recoil system). The barrel and barrel extension continue to move rearward to a point slightly exceeding the combined overall length of the cartridge case and projectile (the long portion of the recoil system, responsible for the weapon's low rate of fire).

After the breech is exposed, an odd lever-type extractor/ejector, mounted under the barrel, pivots to the rear, extracts the empty case, and ejects it through the bottom of the receiver. The bolt's operating cam then forces the bolt face to pivot downward, aligning a cartridge feed groove in the left side of the bolt with the chamber. While the bolt and barrel are returning forward, a cartridge-rammer lever, mounted on the barrel extension, pivots forward, loading a fresh cartridge.

== Operational use ==
=== Up to and including World War I ===
The Madsen was considered expensive to produce, but was known for its reliability. Thirty-four countries bought the gun, in a dozen different calibres, before and after World War I. Mexico had imported 100 Madsens by 1911. They were used by all sides of the Mexican Revolution.

In Britain, the Rexer Arms Company manufactured the Madsen with license from 1905 till 1907 The guns were known as the Rexer or DDRS and exported worldwide. However their license was only for sale in Britain and the Commonwealth. Due to this DRS would sue them causing Rexer to dissolve, with most of its assets ending up in the hands of DRS.

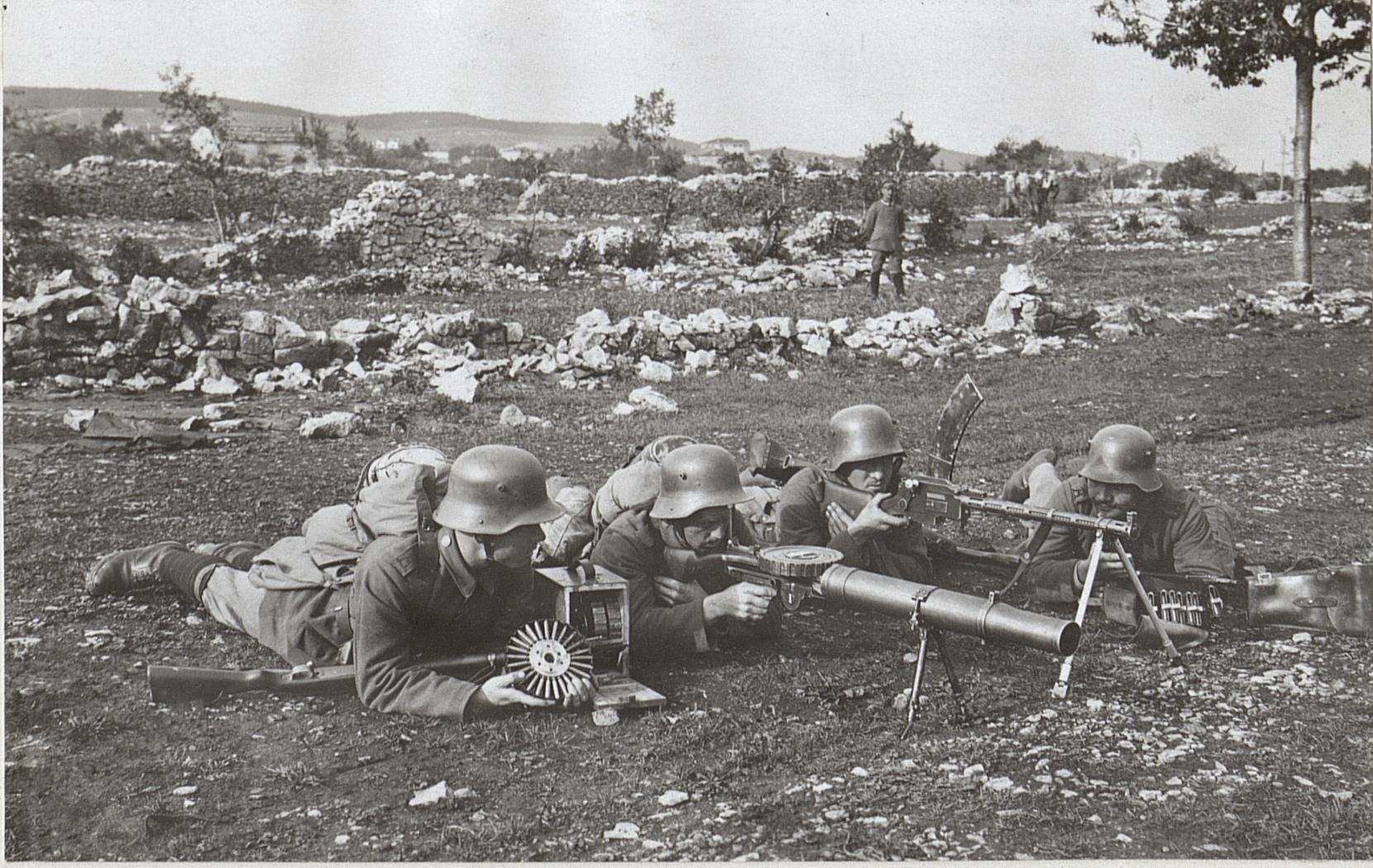
German soldiers compare a Madsen to a Lewis gun on the Isonzo Front ca. 1917

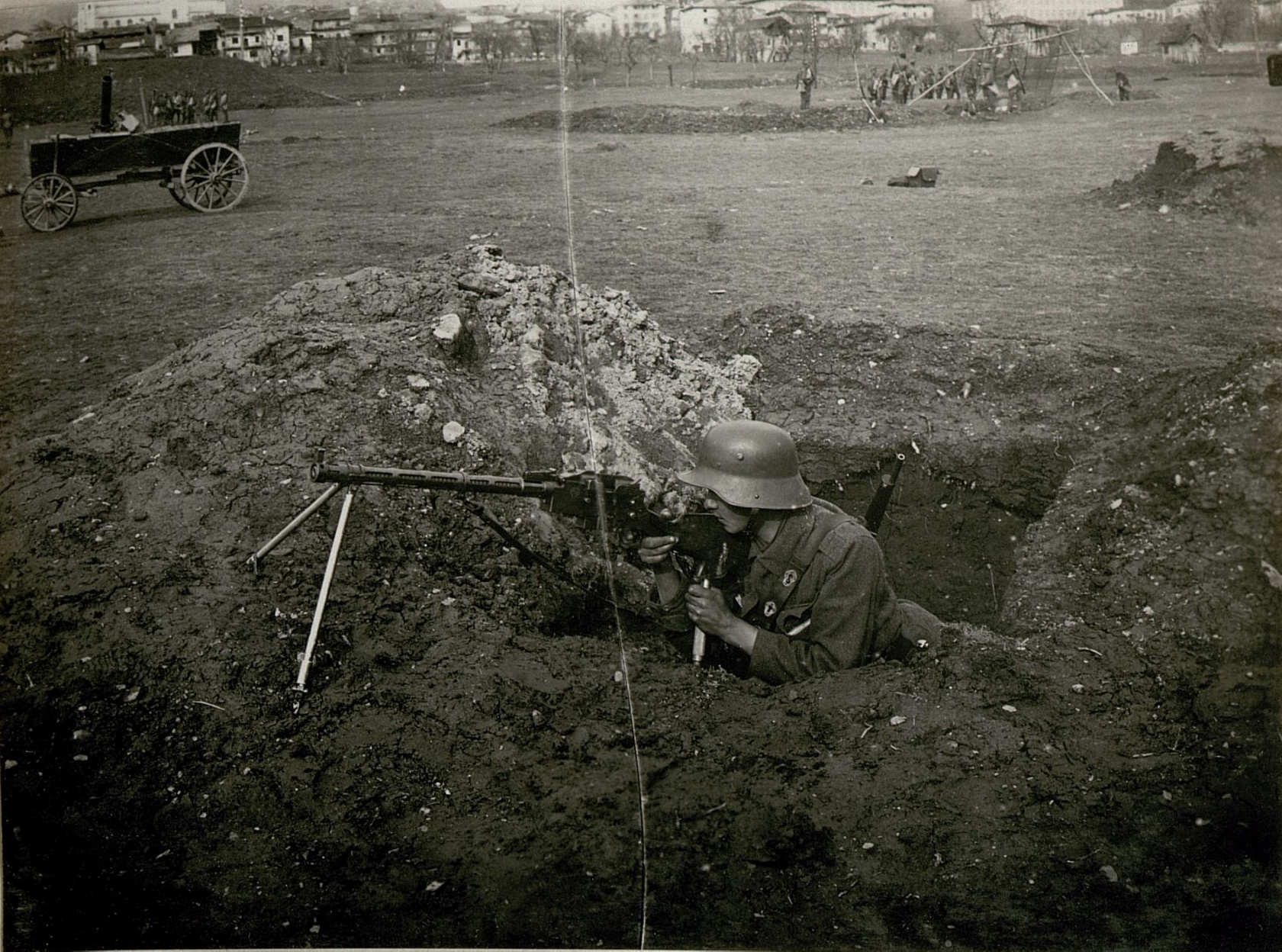
An Austro - Hungarian Stormtrooper trains with his Madsen in Levico, March 1917

The Imperial Russian Army bought 1,250 Madsens initially for the cavalry but also later used issued to other elements of the army and deployed them during the Russo-Japanese War and WW1. The Imperial Russian Air Service used some of these Madsens to equip their Morane-Saulnier G and Morane-Saulnier L monoplanes, and as its open bolt firing cycle made it difficult to fire through a propeller, the Madsen's gun mounting had to fire over the propeller. The German Army deployed the Madsen in 7.92 mm calibre under the designation „Musket M.15“ in 1915; having intercepted a shipment of 660 guns originally destined for Bulgaria in 7x57 Mauser and smuggling about 300 guns in 7.62x54R out of Denmark, they would promptly convert them. It would arm infantry companies in defensive formations. Later selling majority of them to Austria-Hungary between 1915 and 16, who would exclusively use them on the Isonzo front. Small numbers were also used by the Belgians, British and Italians during WW1.

China would acquire about 150 Madsens by 1913, and begin manufacturing a domestic copy at Guangdong Arsenal in 1909.

=== Inter-war era ===
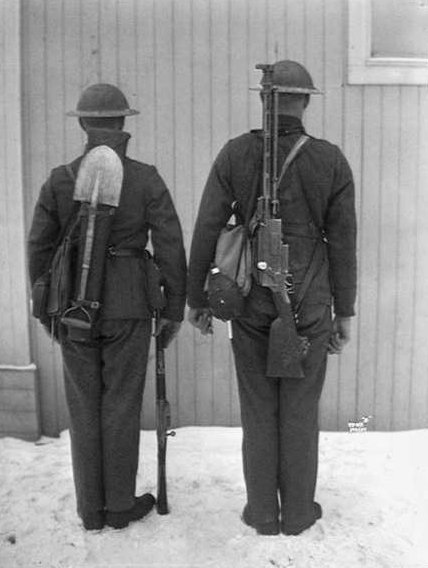
Norwegian soldiers in 1928, one carrying a Madsen machine gun (right)

Among the fighting forces with the Madsen in their arsenals in the immediate aftermath of World War I were the Czechoslovak Legions in Russia, fighting the Bolsheviks in Siberia. The Madsen also saw service in China during the Warlord era. By 1935, China would acquire roughly 300 Madsen machine guns, with under 100 of these being used for Malmö Flygindustri, SIAI, and Caproni aircraft.

Paraguay bought the Madsen in the 1920s and early 1930s as that country quietly girded for war with Bolivia over mutual claims to the Gran Chaco region, and it served in the Paraguayan army in the Chaco War (1932–1935). Almost 400 were on hand when the war began, and the Paraguayans bought more as the war progressed. Bolivia also fielded Madsens of the same calibre as Paraguay (7.65×53 Mauser) during the conflict.

The Argentine Army detachment that protected neutrality along the border with Paraguay and Bolivia during the Chaco War used the Madsen in combat operations at least once in 1933 in the course of an engagement on the southern bank of the Pilcomayo river against members of the Maká tribe commanded by deserters who had looted a farm in Argentine soil, killing some of its inhabitants.

Brazil first acquired Madsen machine guns in 1907. When Brazil acquired some 23 CV-35 tankettes from Italy in the late 1930s, it armed a majority of the vehicles with twin-mounted 7 mm Madsens. In 1943, the Army planned to produce their own Madsen machine guns at the Laminação Nacional de Metais factory, however this never happened.

=== World War II ===
China had imported 438 before and 3,300 Madsens during the Second Sino-Japanese War.

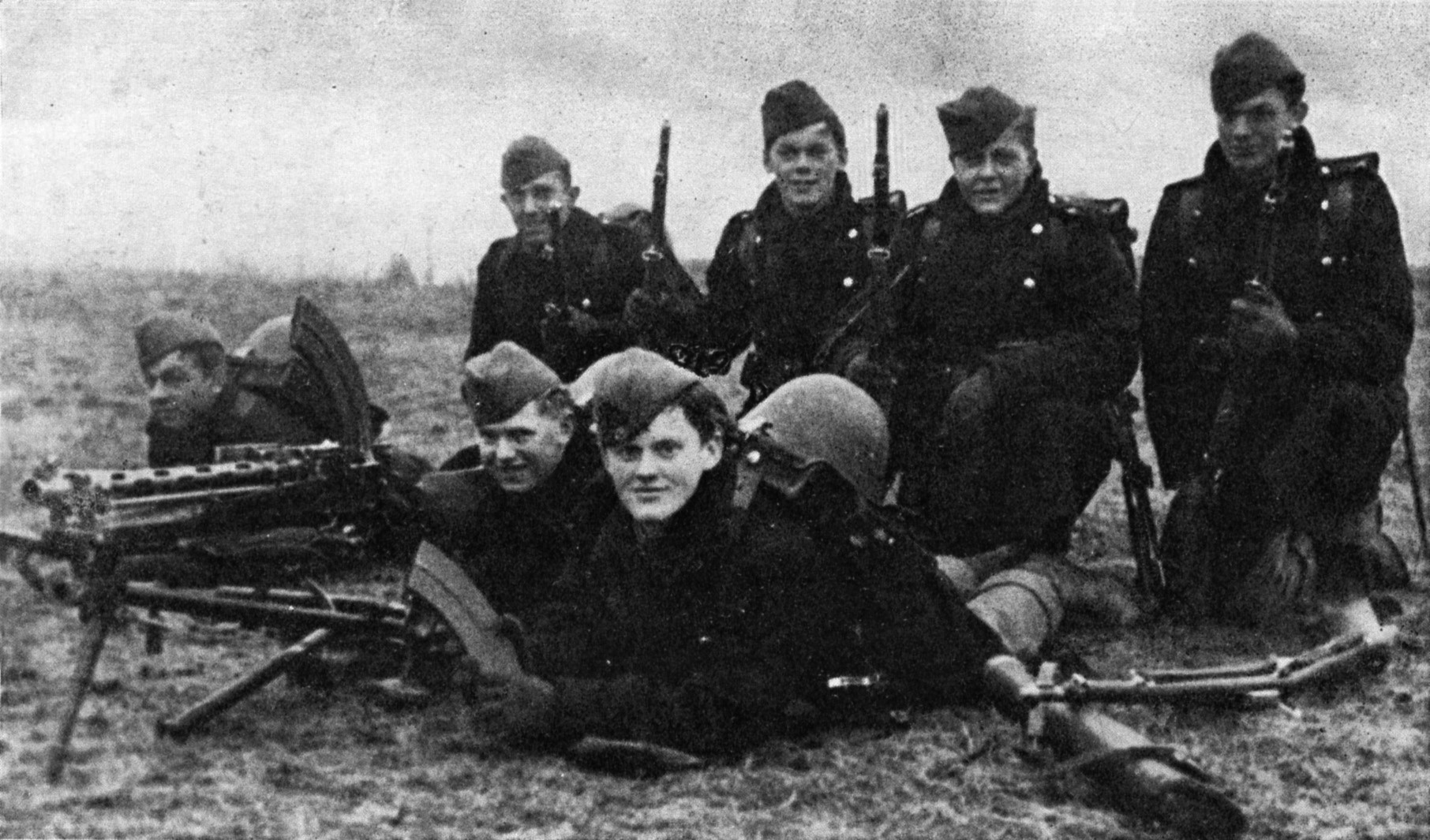
Danish soldiers on 9 April 1940, a M.1903/24 Madsen is prominently seen.

Madsen machine guns were still in use in April–June 1940 as the Norwegian Army's standard light machine gun in the Norwegian campaign, 3,500 M/22s in 6.5×55 Krag being available for the defence of Norway. By 1940 each Norwegian infantry squad had one Madsen machine gun, the Norwegians having previously grouped their Madsen in separate machine gun squads. Each Norwegian infantry battalion had a standard complement of 36 Madsens, in addition to nine M/29 heavy machine guns. However, many Norwegian soldiers did not like the Madsen as it had a tendency to jam after only a few rounds in this calibre, leading to it gaining the nickname Jomfru Madsen (transl. Virgin Madsen). The Danish Army did not retire their last Madsen until 1955.

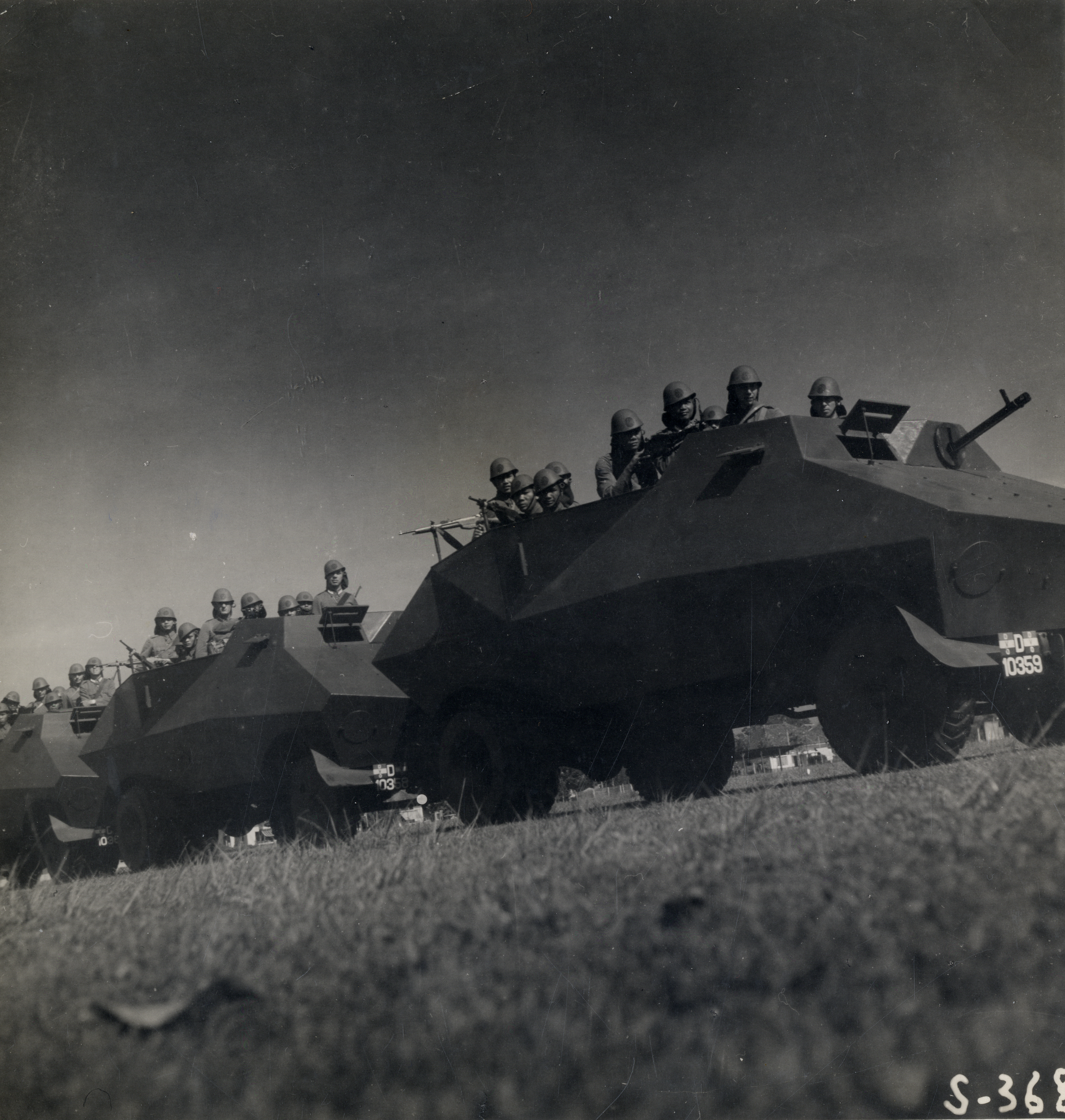
Several Braat Overvalwagens, some Madsens are visible

It was standard equipment (in 6.5 mm) with the Royal Netherlands East Indies Army (KNIL) during the inter-war period until the surrender to the Japanese in 1942. The barrel was shortened in the late 1920s which made it lighter and it was mounted in the Army Model of the Braat Overvalwagen APC. The Imperial Japanese Army used some after capturing them during the Dutch East Indies campaign, evidently during the Guadalcanal campaign.

Germany used captured examples from France, Norway, Czechoslovakia, Denmark, The Soviet union and Yugoslavia in a rear echolon role, limited manufacture of guns continued until 1943 in both 8x58mmR and 7.92x57mm. Hungary and Bulgaria had bought Madsens in the Interwar period and reissued them during the war.

=== Post-war ===
Ireland had a total of 24 Madsen machine guns, all in .303 calibre. They armed the Irish army's Landsverk L60 light tanks, Leyland armoured cars, Landsverk L180 armoured cars, and Dodge armoured cars. In the 1950s .30 Browning machine guns replaced the Madsens still in Irish service.

==== Portuguese Colonial War ====
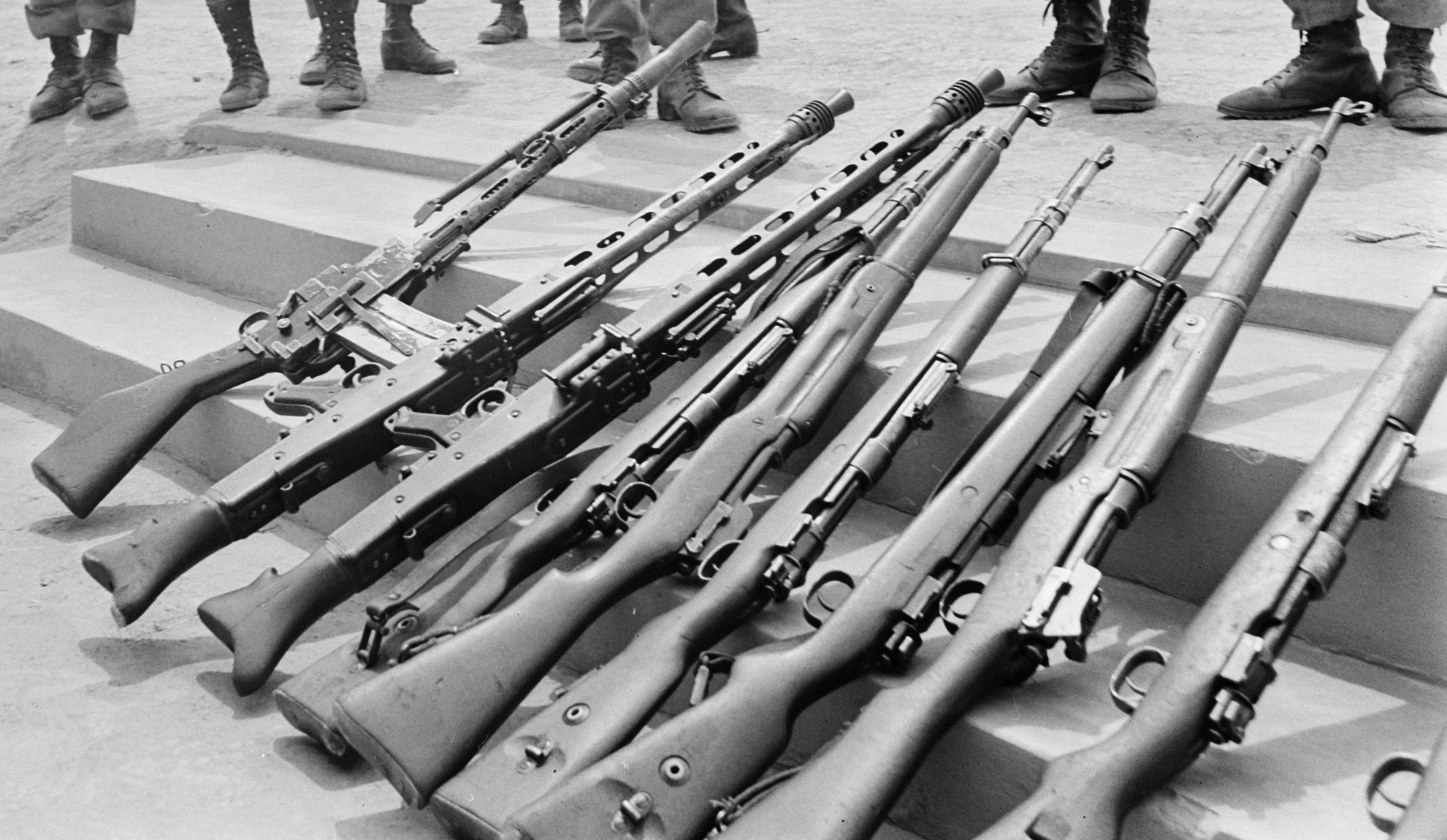
A Madsen machine gun (left) in a training camp of the National Liberation Front of Angola, in Zaire, 1973.

The Portuguese Army used Madsen machine guns during the Portuguese Colonial War of the 1960s and 1970s. Madsens served as temporary armament for Auto-Metralhadora-Daimler 4 × 4 Mod.F/64 armoured cars, which were Daimler Dingos modified with the addition of a turret-like structure.

==== Continued use in Brazil ====
The Brazilian Military Police of Rio de Janeiro State used Madsens into the 21st century. Although some of the Brazilian guns were captured from drug traffickers and pressed into service, the majority of the Brazilian police Madsens came from the Brazilian Army; in the 1930s they were commonly used in the wars against banditry in Northeast (bandit groups named cangaceiros); these guns were originally 7x57mm Spanish Mauser weapons, later re-chambered to fit 7.62 mm NATO. Official sources state that the Brazilian army retired the Madsen machine gun in 1996. It was reported that plans were in place to retire the last Madsen guns in service with the Civil Police of Rio de Janeiro State starting in 2008. As of 2018, the Madsen was still used by the police. It was favored by police for its reliability and intimidating sound.

== Users ==
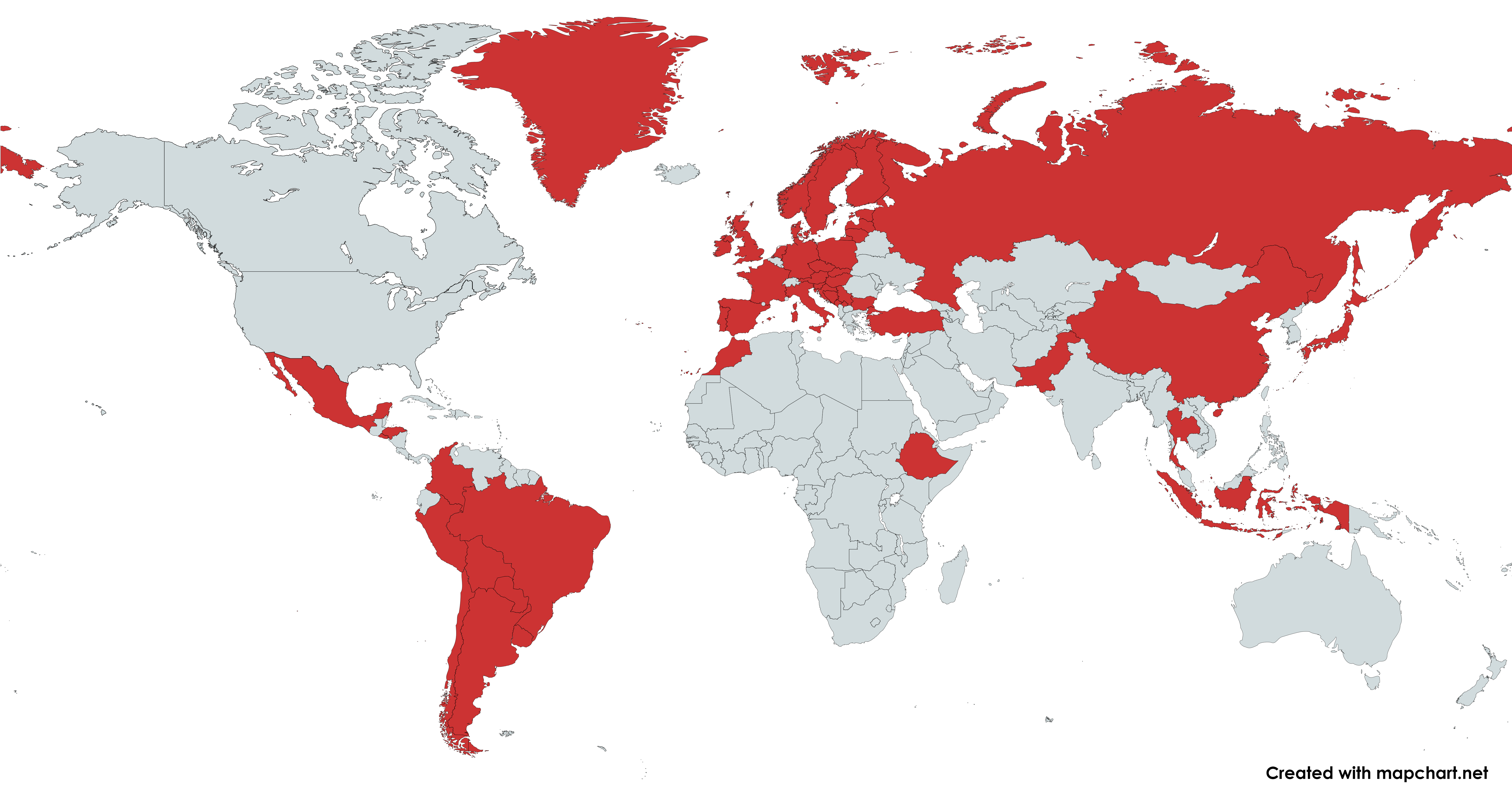
A map with users of the Madsen machine gun former users in red

- Argentina — Purchased Models of 1910, 1925, 1926, 1931 and 1935 (mostly in 7.65mm Argentine).
- Austria
- Austria-Hungary — 632 or 700-800 bought from Germany between 1915 and 16(conjecture)
- Belgium —Adopted in 1914 in 7.65 Mauser only a small number acquired
- Bolivia — Model of 1925 in 7.65 Mauser
- Brazil — Models of 1907, 1913, 1916, 1925, 1928, 1932, 1934, 1935 and 1936, in 7×57mm Mauser and Model 1946 in .30-06
  - São Paulo
- Bulgaria — 660 Model 1905s bought in 1915 in 7x57 confiscated by germany; Model 1924 received in 1928 chambered in 8×50mmR Mannlicher).
- Colombia
- Congo Free State Troupes de Katanga of the Force Publique likely in 7.65 Mauser
- Czechoslovakia — M1922 and M1923, in 7.92 Mauser
  - Czechoslovak Legions ex Russian guns in 7.62x54mmR
- Chile — Models of 1923, 1925, 1926, 1928 and 1940, most in 7mm Mauser. Model 1946 in caliber .30-06
- Republic of China — Madsen M1916, Rexer, M1930 and M1937 variants, all in 7.92 Mauser
- Qing Empire — Rexer and local copies in 7.92
- Denmark — M1903 (later updated to M1903/24), M1924, M1929 in 8×58mmR and M1948 in .30-06
- El Salvador — M1934 in 7mm Mauser and M1951 in .30-06
- Estonia — 600 gifted by Britain in 1919, M1925 and M1937 in .303 British Bought Finnish surplus Madsens in 1937 in 7.62x54R
- Ethiopia — M1907, M1910, M1934 and M1935, in 7.92 Mauser
- Finland — M1920, M1921 and M1923 in 7.62×54mmR. The M1920 was designated as 7,62 pk/20. A few Russian and German Madsens were used in the Finnish Civil War, and adopted in larger quantities by the army in 1926; retired and sold to Estonia in 1937
- France — Models 1915, 1919, 1922 and 1924 in 8mm Lebel
  - French Morocco
  - Mandate of Syria
- German Empire — Small number captured from Belgium in 1914, in 1915 an order meant for Bulgaria of 660 guns in 7x57 intercepted and about 300 in 7.62x54R smuggled from Denmark, all converted to 7.92mm
- Nazi Germany — Models of 1941 and 1942 in 7.92mm and various others captured from other countries
- Honduras — Models of 1937 and 1939 in 7mm
- Hungary — Model 1924 in 7.92x57
- Indonesia — M1950 in .30-06 and former KNIL in 6.5x53mmR
- Ireland
- Italy — Models of 1908 Rexer and 1910, 1925 and 1930 in 6.5×52mm Carcano
- Japan — Captured from the Dutch East Indies
- Latvia — 3 pieces in stock of the Latvian Army by April 1936
- Lithuania — Model of 1923 in 7.92mm
- Mexico — Model 1911, rexerand 1934 in 7mm
- Norway — Models of 1914 and 1918 and 1922 in 6.5×55mm Swedish
- Netherlands — Models of 1919, 1923, 1926, 1927, 1934, 1938 and 1939 in 6.5×53mmR. The model of 1915 was used by the KNIL as geweermitrailleur (and karabijnmitrailleur for a shortened version modified in 1926–1927),in 1938 an unknown number of additional guns were bought
- Pakistan — M1947 in .303
- Paraguay — M1916 in 7.65mm
- Peru — M1929 in 7.65mm
- Portugal — Models of 1930, 1936 and 1952 in .303 and models of 1936, 1940 and 1947 in 7.92mm
- Russian Empire — Model 1904 and Model 1916 in 7.62×54mmR
- USSR — Model 1904 and Model 1916 in 7.62×54mmR from tsarist-era warehouse stocks alongside models appropriated from Baltic arsenals, used primarily by irregular forces.
- Spain — M1907 and M1922 in 7mm
  - Spanish Republic
- Sweden — M1906, M1914 and M1921 in 6.5×55mm
- Thailand — Models of 1925, 1930, 1934, 1939, 1947 and 1949 in 8mm Siamese and Model 1951 in .30-06.
- Turkey — M1925, 1926, 1935 and 1937 in 7.92mm
- United Kingdom — Small scale adoption of Rexer colonialy, 900 ordered in WW1 none delivered due to danish neutrality, said guns were delivered and built after the war with 600 being gifted to Estonia, a variant (possibly the guns from the contract) trialed in 1918,all in .303 British
  - Colony of Natal — 27 Rexer machine guns were used during the Bambatha Rebellion
  - Union of South Africa—At least 8 Rexers available by WW1
  - Dominion of New Zealand — Trialed alongside UK in 1918
  - British Raj— Very small number of Rexers
- Uruguay — M1937 in 7mm
- Yugoslavia — Various models in 7.92mm Mauser

== See also ==
=== Contemporary machine guns ===
- Kjellman machine gun
- Chauchat
- M1918 BAR
- Lewis gun

=== Machine guns with similar magazine layout ===
- Vickers–Berthier
- FM-24/29
- ZB vz. 26
- Bren gun
- Type 96 light machine gun
- Type 99 light machine gun
- Type 73 machine gun
