= Herman Madsen =

Danish general and politician

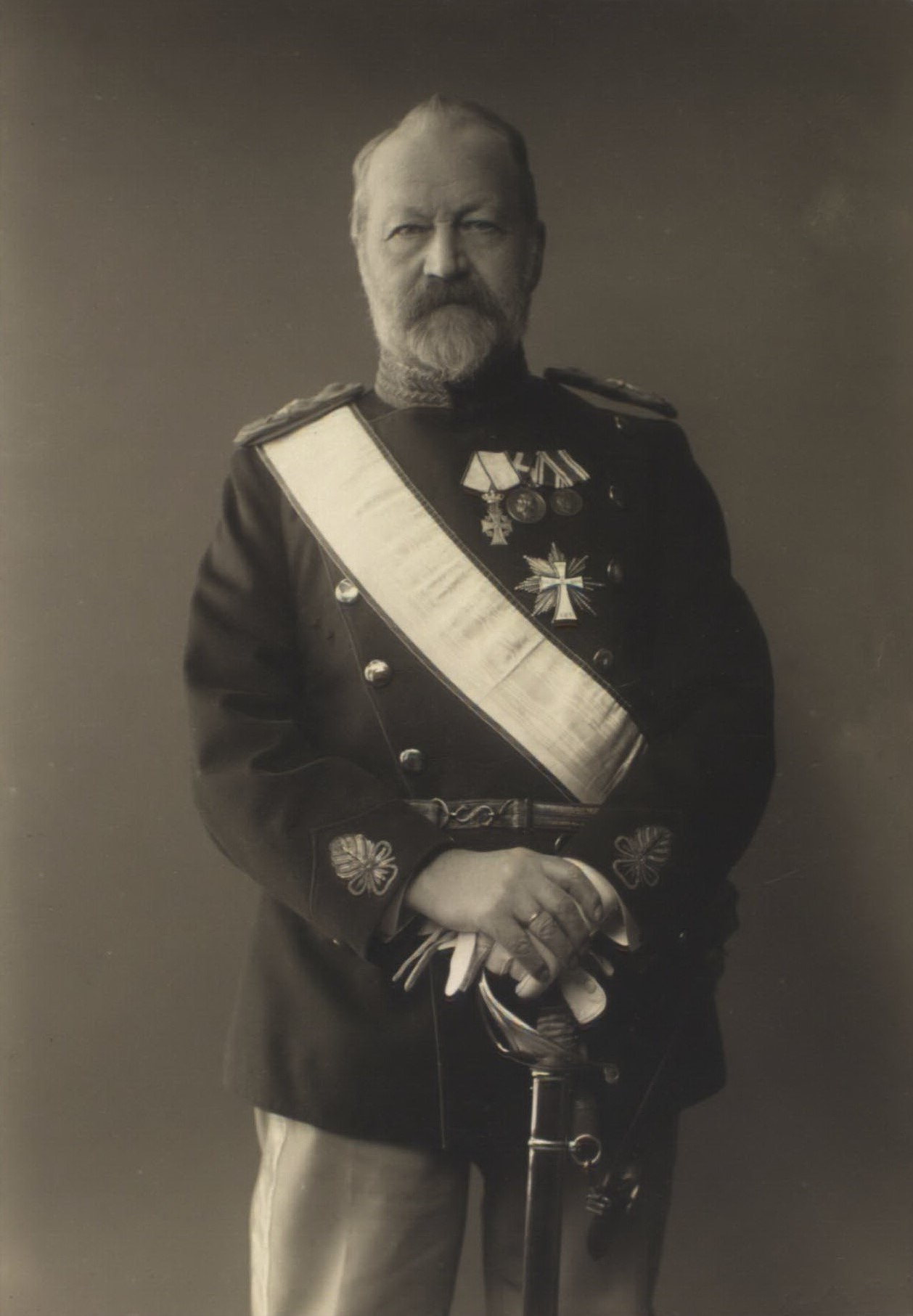

Minister of War
- In office 24 July 1901 – 14 January 1905
- Monarch: Christian IX
- Prime Minister: Johan Henrik Deuntzer
- Preceded by: Johan Gustav Frederik Schnack
- Succeeded by: Office abolished

Personal details
- Born: Vilhelm Herman Oluf Madsen; 11 April 1844 Copenhagen, Denmark
- Died: 14 June 1917 (aged 73) Frederiksberg
- Resting place: Garrison Cemetery
- Party: Venstre Reform Party
- Spouse: Albertine Henriette Petersen
- Children: Thorvald Madsen
- Parent(s): Jeppe Madsen (father); Johanne Christine Becker (mother)

Military service
- Allegiance: Denmark
- Branch/service: Royal Danish Army
- Years of service: 1859–1905
- Rank: General
- Battles/wars: Second War of Schleswig

Vilhelm Herman Oluf Madsen (11 April 1844 – 14 June 1917) was a Danish politician, minister, army officer, businessman and inventor who served as War Minister in the 1901–1905 Deuntzer Cabinet.

== Career ==
Madsen began his military career in 1859 and served in the Second War of Schleswig of 1864 as a lieutenant. In 1896, at the rank of colonel, Madsen was responsible for the adoption of the Madsen machine gun by the Danish army in 1902 and widely exported. He also constructed the Madsen 20 mm anti-aircraft cannon.

As Minister of War in the Cabinet of J. H. Deuntzer from 1901 to 1905, he supported the Fortification of Copenhagen, which contributed to the conflict that led to the split of the Venstre Reform Party as the left wing of the party left the party in protest to form the Radikale Venstre. Madsen became a general in 1903 and was elected to the Folketing in 1909.

== Personal life ==
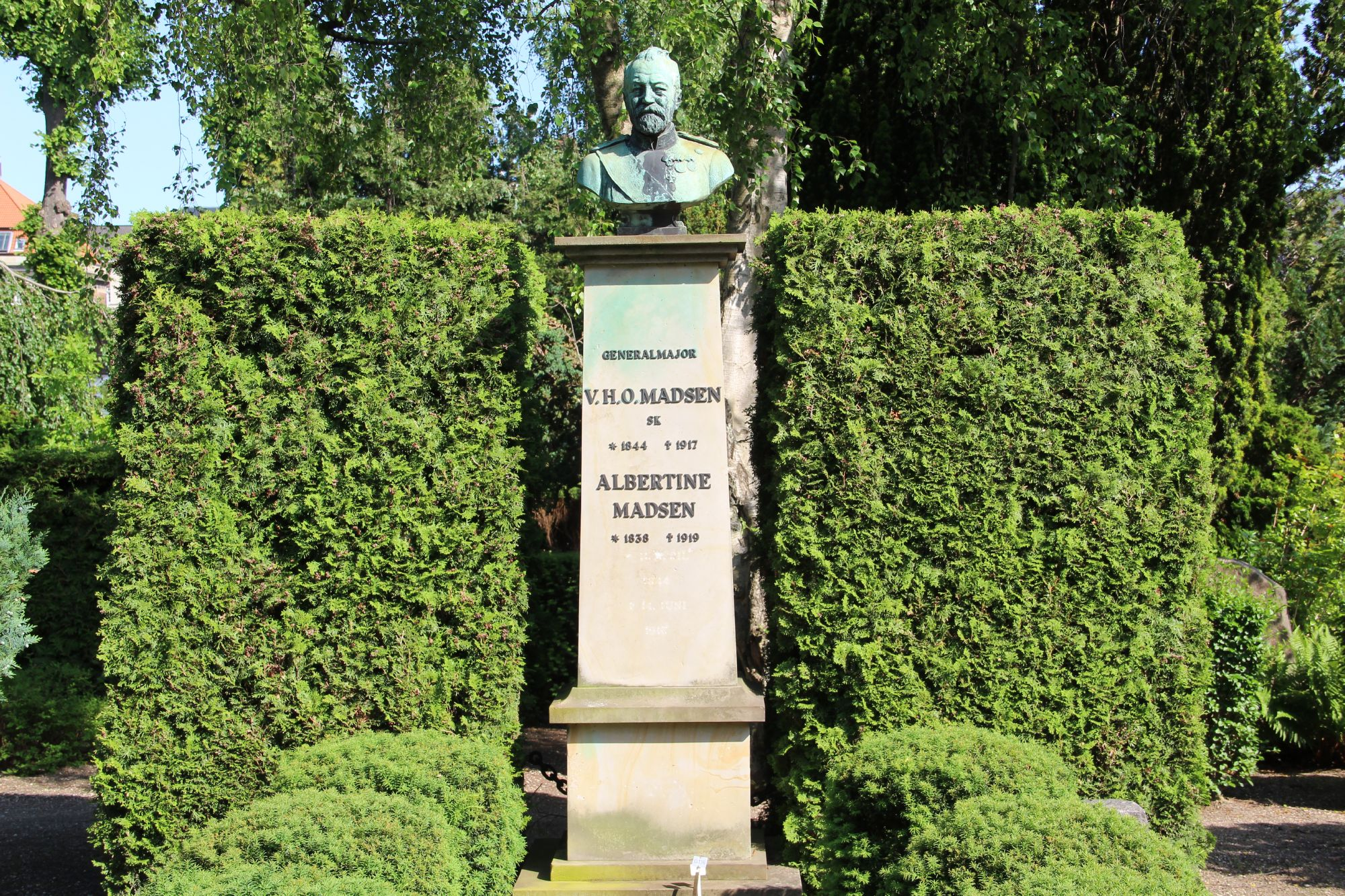
Madsen's tomb at the Garrison Cemetery in Copenhagen.

Madsen was the father of the physician Thorvald Madsen. He was interested in mathematics and was the president of Danish Mathematical Society from 1903 to 1910.

== Sources ==
- Bjørn A. Nielsen, Den danske hærs rekylgeværer : system V.H.O. Madsen og J.A.N. Rasmussen, Statens Forsvarshistoriske Museum, 2008. (Forsvarshistoriske skrifter, nr. 6).
- Article "Madsen, Vilhelm Herman Oluf", pp. 23–26, in: Dansk Biografisk Lexikon, 1. ed, vol. XI, 1897

Political offices
Preceded by Johan Gustav Frederik Schnack	Minister of War; 24 July 1901 – 14 January 1905	Succeeded by Office abolished
